

132001–132100 

|-bgcolor=#fefefe
| 132001 ||  || — || February 7, 2002 || Socorro || LINEAR || MAS || align=right | 1.8 km || 
|-id=002 bgcolor=#fefefe
| 132002 ||  || — || February 7, 2002 || Socorro || LINEAR || MAS || align=right | 1.4 km || 
|-id=003 bgcolor=#fefefe
| 132003 ||  || — || February 7, 2002 || Socorro || LINEAR || FLO || align=right | 1.7 km || 
|-id=004 bgcolor=#fefefe
| 132004 ||  || — || February 7, 2002 || Socorro || LINEAR || — || align=right | 1.6 km || 
|-id=005 bgcolor=#fefefe
| 132005 Scottmcgregor ||  ||  || February 7, 2002 || Socorro || LINEAR || V || align=right | 1.5 km || 
|-id=006 bgcolor=#fefefe
| 132006 ||  || — || February 7, 2002 || Socorro || LINEAR || NYS || align=right data-sort-value="0.98" | 980 m || 
|-id=007 bgcolor=#fefefe
| 132007 ||  || — || February 7, 2002 || Socorro || LINEAR || NYS || align=right | 1.6 km || 
|-id=008 bgcolor=#fefefe
| 132008 ||  || — || February 7, 2002 || Socorro || LINEAR || — || align=right | 1.5 km || 
|-id=009 bgcolor=#fefefe
| 132009 ||  || — || February 7, 2002 || Socorro || LINEAR || — || align=right | 3.3 km || 
|-id=010 bgcolor=#fefefe
| 132010 ||  || — || February 7, 2002 || Socorro || LINEAR || V || align=right | 1.5 km || 
|-id=011 bgcolor=#fefefe
| 132011 ||  || — || February 7, 2002 || Socorro || LINEAR || — || align=right | 1.3 km || 
|-id=012 bgcolor=#E9E9E9
| 132012 ||  || — || February 7, 2002 || Socorro || LINEAR || — || align=right | 2.6 km || 
|-id=013 bgcolor=#fefefe
| 132013 ||  || — || February 7, 2002 || Socorro || LINEAR || V || align=right | 1.6 km || 
|-id=014 bgcolor=#fefefe
| 132014 ||  || — || February 7, 2002 || Socorro || LINEAR || — || align=right | 2.3 km || 
|-id=015 bgcolor=#fefefe
| 132015 ||  || — || February 7, 2002 || Socorro || LINEAR || NYS || align=right | 1.2 km || 
|-id=016 bgcolor=#fefefe
| 132016 ||  || — || February 7, 2002 || Socorro || LINEAR || — || align=right | 1.5 km || 
|-id=017 bgcolor=#fefefe
| 132017 ||  || — || February 7, 2002 || Socorro || LINEAR || NYS || align=right | 1.4 km || 
|-id=018 bgcolor=#fefefe
| 132018 ||  || — || February 7, 2002 || Socorro || LINEAR || NYS || align=right | 1.3 km || 
|-id=019 bgcolor=#fefefe
| 132019 ||  || — || February 7, 2002 || Socorro || LINEAR || — || align=right | 1.5 km || 
|-id=020 bgcolor=#fefefe
| 132020 ||  || — || February 7, 2002 || Socorro || LINEAR || MAS || align=right | 1.2 km || 
|-id=021 bgcolor=#fefefe
| 132021 ||  || — || February 7, 2002 || Socorro || LINEAR || NYS || align=right | 3.4 km || 
|-id=022 bgcolor=#fefefe
| 132022 ||  || — || February 7, 2002 || Socorro || LINEAR || — || align=right | 1.7 km || 
|-id=023 bgcolor=#fefefe
| 132023 ||  || — || February 7, 2002 || Socorro || LINEAR || NYS || align=right | 1.5 km || 
|-id=024 bgcolor=#fefefe
| 132024 ||  || — || February 8, 2002 || Socorro || LINEAR || NYS || align=right | 1.3 km || 
|-id=025 bgcolor=#fefefe
| 132025 ||  || — || February 8, 2002 || Socorro || LINEAR || — || align=right | 1.8 km || 
|-id=026 bgcolor=#fefefe
| 132026 ||  || — || February 8, 2002 || Socorro || LINEAR || — || align=right | 1.9 km || 
|-id=027 bgcolor=#fefefe
| 132027 ||  || — || February 9, 2002 || Socorro || LINEAR || NYS || align=right | 1.2 km || 
|-id=028 bgcolor=#fefefe
| 132028 ||  || — || February 14, 2002 || Nashville || R. Clingan || — || align=right | 1.5 km || 
|-id=029 bgcolor=#fefefe
| 132029 ||  || — || February 14, 2002 || Desert Eagle || W. K. Y. Yeung || — || align=right | 1.5 km || 
|-id=030 bgcolor=#fefefe
| 132030 ||  || — || February 7, 2002 || Socorro || LINEAR || — || align=right | 1.2 km || 
|-id=031 bgcolor=#fefefe
| 132031 ||  || — || February 7, 2002 || Socorro || LINEAR || — || align=right | 1.2 km || 
|-id=032 bgcolor=#fefefe
| 132032 ||  || — || February 7, 2002 || Socorro || LINEAR || — || align=right | 1.4 km || 
|-id=033 bgcolor=#fefefe
| 132033 ||  || — || February 7, 2002 || Socorro || LINEAR || NYS || align=right | 1.2 km || 
|-id=034 bgcolor=#fefefe
| 132034 ||  || — || February 7, 2002 || Socorro || LINEAR || NYS || align=right | 1.1 km || 
|-id=035 bgcolor=#fefefe
| 132035 ||  || — || February 7, 2002 || Socorro || LINEAR || — || align=right | 1.4 km || 
|-id=036 bgcolor=#fefefe
| 132036 ||  || — || February 7, 2002 || Socorro || LINEAR || MAS || align=right | 1.0 km || 
|-id=037 bgcolor=#fefefe
| 132037 ||  || — || February 7, 2002 || Socorro || LINEAR || V || align=right data-sort-value="0.96" | 960 m || 
|-id=038 bgcolor=#fefefe
| 132038 ||  || — || February 7, 2002 || Socorro || LINEAR || — || align=right | 1.2 km || 
|-id=039 bgcolor=#fefefe
| 132039 ||  || — || February 7, 2002 || Socorro || LINEAR || NYS || align=right | 1.1 km || 
|-id=040 bgcolor=#fefefe
| 132040 ||  || — || February 7, 2002 || Socorro || LINEAR || MAS || align=right | 1.1 km || 
|-id=041 bgcolor=#fefefe
| 132041 ||  || — || February 7, 2002 || Socorro || LINEAR || — || align=right | 1.6 km || 
|-id=042 bgcolor=#fefefe
| 132042 ||  || — || February 7, 2002 || Socorro || LINEAR || NYS || align=right | 1.1 km || 
|-id=043 bgcolor=#fefefe
| 132043 ||  || — || February 7, 2002 || Socorro || LINEAR || — || align=right | 1.6 km || 
|-id=044 bgcolor=#fefefe
| 132044 ||  || — || February 7, 2002 || Socorro || LINEAR || MAS || align=right | 1.0 km || 
|-id=045 bgcolor=#fefefe
| 132045 ||  || — || February 7, 2002 || Socorro || LINEAR || MAS || align=right | 1.3 km || 
|-id=046 bgcolor=#E9E9E9
| 132046 ||  || — || February 7, 2002 || Socorro || LINEAR || — || align=right | 1.4 km || 
|-id=047 bgcolor=#fefefe
| 132047 ||  || — || February 8, 2002 || Socorro || LINEAR || V || align=right | 1.2 km || 
|-id=048 bgcolor=#fefefe
| 132048 ||  || — || February 8, 2002 || Socorro || LINEAR || — || align=right | 1.4 km || 
|-id=049 bgcolor=#fefefe
| 132049 ||  || — || February 8, 2002 || Socorro || LINEAR || NYS || align=right | 1.2 km || 
|-id=050 bgcolor=#fefefe
| 132050 ||  || — || February 8, 2002 || Socorro || LINEAR || — || align=right | 1.7 km || 
|-id=051 bgcolor=#fefefe
| 132051 ||  || — || February 8, 2002 || Socorro || LINEAR || V || align=right | 1.4 km || 
|-id=052 bgcolor=#fefefe
| 132052 ||  || — || February 8, 2002 || Socorro || LINEAR || FLO || align=right | 1.1 km || 
|-id=053 bgcolor=#fefefe
| 132053 ||  || — || February 8, 2002 || Socorro || LINEAR || FLO || align=right | 1.2 km || 
|-id=054 bgcolor=#fefefe
| 132054 ||  || — || February 8, 2002 || Socorro || LINEAR || — || align=right | 1.5 km || 
|-id=055 bgcolor=#fefefe
| 132055 ||  || — || February 8, 2002 || Socorro || LINEAR || — || align=right | 1.6 km || 
|-id=056 bgcolor=#fefefe
| 132056 ||  || — || February 8, 2002 || Socorro || LINEAR || ERI || align=right | 3.6 km || 
|-id=057 bgcolor=#fefefe
| 132057 ||  || — || February 8, 2002 || Socorro || LINEAR || — || align=right | 1.9 km || 
|-id=058 bgcolor=#fefefe
| 132058 ||  || — || February 8, 2002 || Socorro || LINEAR || — || align=right | 1.5 km || 
|-id=059 bgcolor=#fefefe
| 132059 ||  || — || February 8, 2002 || Socorro || LINEAR || — || align=right | 2.9 km || 
|-id=060 bgcolor=#fefefe
| 132060 ||  || — || February 9, 2002 || Socorro || LINEAR || — || align=right | 1.5 km || 
|-id=061 bgcolor=#fefefe
| 132061 ||  || — || February 9, 2002 || Socorro || LINEAR || V || align=right | 1.2 km || 
|-id=062 bgcolor=#fefefe
| 132062 ||  || — || February 9, 2002 || Socorro || LINEAR || — || align=right | 1.4 km || 
|-id=063 bgcolor=#fefefe
| 132063 ||  || — || February 9, 2002 || Socorro || LINEAR || NYS || align=right | 1.1 km || 
|-id=064 bgcolor=#fefefe
| 132064 ||  || — || February 9, 2002 || Socorro || LINEAR || MAS || align=right | 1.4 km || 
|-id=065 bgcolor=#fefefe
| 132065 ||  || — || February 9, 2002 || Socorro || LINEAR || V || align=right | 1.3 km || 
|-id=066 bgcolor=#E9E9E9
| 132066 ||  || — || February 9, 2002 || Socorro || LINEAR || — || align=right | 4.4 km || 
|-id=067 bgcolor=#fefefe
| 132067 ||  || — || February 10, 2002 || Socorro || LINEAR || — || align=right | 1.2 km || 
|-id=068 bgcolor=#fefefe
| 132068 ||  || — || February 10, 2002 || Socorro || LINEAR || — || align=right | 1.7 km || 
|-id=069 bgcolor=#fefefe
| 132069 ||  || — || February 10, 2002 || Socorro || LINEAR || — || align=right | 1.6 km || 
|-id=070 bgcolor=#fefefe
| 132070 ||  || — || February 9, 2002 || Kitt Peak || Spacewatch || — || align=right | 1.4 km || 
|-id=071 bgcolor=#fefefe
| 132071 ||  || — || February 7, 2002 || Socorro || LINEAR || NYS || align=right | 1.2 km || 
|-id=072 bgcolor=#E9E9E9
| 132072 ||  || — || February 7, 2002 || Socorro || LINEAR || — || align=right | 2.9 km || 
|-id=073 bgcolor=#fefefe
| 132073 ||  || — || February 8, 2002 || Socorro || LINEAR || V || align=right | 1.2 km || 
|-id=074 bgcolor=#fefefe
| 132074 ||  || — || February 8, 2002 || Socorro || LINEAR || V || align=right | 1.2 km || 
|-id=075 bgcolor=#fefefe
| 132075 ||  || — || February 8, 2002 || Socorro || LINEAR || SUL || align=right | 2.9 km || 
|-id=076 bgcolor=#fefefe
| 132076 ||  || — || February 8, 2002 || Socorro || LINEAR || NYS || align=right data-sort-value="0.88" | 880 m || 
|-id=077 bgcolor=#fefefe
| 132077 ||  || — || February 8, 2002 || Socorro || LINEAR || V || align=right | 1.0 km || 
|-id=078 bgcolor=#fefefe
| 132078 ||  || — || February 8, 2002 || Socorro || LINEAR || — || align=right | 1.9 km || 
|-id=079 bgcolor=#fefefe
| 132079 ||  || — || February 8, 2002 || Socorro || LINEAR || FLO || align=right | 1.2 km || 
|-id=080 bgcolor=#fefefe
| 132080 ||  || — || February 8, 2002 || Socorro || LINEAR || — || align=right | 1.2 km || 
|-id=081 bgcolor=#fefefe
| 132081 ||  || — || February 8, 2002 || Socorro || LINEAR || NYS || align=right | 1.4 km || 
|-id=082 bgcolor=#fefefe
| 132082 ||  || — || February 8, 2002 || Socorro || LINEAR || V || align=right | 1.2 km || 
|-id=083 bgcolor=#fefefe
| 132083 ||  || — || February 8, 2002 || Socorro || LINEAR || — || align=right | 1.8 km || 
|-id=084 bgcolor=#fefefe
| 132084 ||  || — || February 8, 2002 || Socorro || LINEAR || — || align=right | 1.6 km || 
|-id=085 bgcolor=#fefefe
| 132085 ||  || — || February 8, 2002 || Socorro || LINEAR || NYS || align=right | 1.2 km || 
|-id=086 bgcolor=#fefefe
| 132086 ||  || — || February 8, 2002 || Socorro || LINEAR || — || align=right | 2.0 km || 
|-id=087 bgcolor=#fefefe
| 132087 ||  || — || February 8, 2002 || Socorro || LINEAR || FLO || align=right | 1.3 km || 
|-id=088 bgcolor=#fefefe
| 132088 ||  || — || February 8, 2002 || Socorro || LINEAR || NYS || align=right | 1.2 km || 
|-id=089 bgcolor=#fefefe
| 132089 ||  || — || February 8, 2002 || Socorro || LINEAR || — || align=right | 2.2 km || 
|-id=090 bgcolor=#fefefe
| 132090 ||  || — || February 8, 2002 || Socorro || LINEAR || FLO || align=right | 1.7 km || 
|-id=091 bgcolor=#fefefe
| 132091 ||  || — || February 9, 2002 || Socorro || LINEAR || NYS || align=right | 4.0 km || 
|-id=092 bgcolor=#fefefe
| 132092 ||  || — || February 10, 2002 || Socorro || LINEAR || — || align=right | 1.2 km || 
|-id=093 bgcolor=#fefefe
| 132093 ||  || — || February 10, 2002 || Socorro || LINEAR || — || align=right | 1.1 km || 
|-id=094 bgcolor=#E9E9E9
| 132094 ||  || — || February 10, 2002 || Socorro || LINEAR || — || align=right | 2.5 km || 
|-id=095 bgcolor=#fefefe
| 132095 ||  || — || February 10, 2002 || Socorro || LINEAR || — || align=right | 1.2 km || 
|-id=096 bgcolor=#E9E9E9
| 132096 ||  || — || February 10, 2002 || Socorro || LINEAR || — || align=right | 1.5 km || 
|-id=097 bgcolor=#fefefe
| 132097 ||  || — || February 10, 2002 || Socorro || LINEAR || NYS || align=right | 1.1 km || 
|-id=098 bgcolor=#fefefe
| 132098 ||  || — || February 10, 2002 || Socorro || LINEAR || — || align=right | 1.2 km || 
|-id=099 bgcolor=#fefefe
| 132099 ||  || — || February 10, 2002 || Socorro || LINEAR || NYS || align=right | 1.3 km || 
|-id=100 bgcolor=#fefefe
| 132100 ||  || — || February 10, 2002 || Socorro || LINEAR || MAS || align=right | 1.3 km || 
|}

132101–132200 

|-bgcolor=#fefefe
| 132101 ||  || — || February 10, 2002 || Socorro || LINEAR || NYS || align=right | 1.3 km || 
|-id=102 bgcolor=#E9E9E9
| 132102 ||  || — || February 10, 2002 || Socorro || LINEAR || — || align=right | 2.6 km || 
|-id=103 bgcolor=#fefefe
| 132103 ||  || — || February 10, 2002 || Socorro || LINEAR || — || align=right | 1.4 km || 
|-id=104 bgcolor=#E9E9E9
| 132104 ||  || — || February 10, 2002 || Socorro || LINEAR || — || align=right | 2.0 km || 
|-id=105 bgcolor=#fefefe
| 132105 ||  || — || February 10, 2002 || Socorro || LINEAR || — || align=right | 1.2 km || 
|-id=106 bgcolor=#fefefe
| 132106 ||  || — || February 10, 2002 || Socorro || LINEAR || — || align=right | 1.2 km || 
|-id=107 bgcolor=#fefefe
| 132107 ||  || — || February 10, 2002 || Socorro || LINEAR || FLO || align=right | 2.1 km || 
|-id=108 bgcolor=#E9E9E9
| 132108 ||  || — || February 10, 2002 || Socorro || LINEAR || — || align=right | 1.2 km || 
|-id=109 bgcolor=#fefefe
| 132109 ||  || — || February 10, 2002 || Socorro || LINEAR || — || align=right | 1.4 km || 
|-id=110 bgcolor=#fefefe
| 132110 ||  || — || February 10, 2002 || Socorro || LINEAR || — || align=right | 1.3 km || 
|-id=111 bgcolor=#fefefe
| 132111 ||  || — || February 10, 2002 || Socorro || LINEAR || — || align=right | 1.5 km || 
|-id=112 bgcolor=#fefefe
| 132112 ||  || — || February 10, 2002 || Socorro || LINEAR || MAS || align=right | 1.6 km || 
|-id=113 bgcolor=#fefefe
| 132113 ||  || — || February 11, 2002 || Socorro || LINEAR || — || align=right | 1.5 km || 
|-id=114 bgcolor=#fefefe
| 132114 ||  || — || February 11, 2002 || Socorro || LINEAR || NYS || align=right | 1.3 km || 
|-id=115 bgcolor=#E9E9E9
| 132115 ||  || — || February 15, 2002 || Bergisch Gladbach || W. Bickel || — || align=right | 3.5 km || 
|-id=116 bgcolor=#fefefe
| 132116 ||  || — || February 4, 2002 || Haleakala || NEAT || — || align=right | 1.7 km || 
|-id=117 bgcolor=#fefefe
| 132117 ||  || — || February 5, 2002 || Palomar || NEAT || V || align=right | 1.2 km || 
|-id=118 bgcolor=#fefefe
| 132118 ||  || — || February 6, 2002 || Palomar || NEAT || FLO || align=right | 1.1 km || 
|-id=119 bgcolor=#fefefe
| 132119 ||  || — || February 10, 2002 || Kitt Peak || Spacewatch || NYS || align=right | 1.4 km || 
|-id=120 bgcolor=#fefefe
| 132120 ||  || — || February 12, 2002 || Kitt Peak || Spacewatch || NYS || align=right | 1.1 km || 
|-id=121 bgcolor=#E9E9E9
| 132121 ||  || — || February 11, 2002 || Socorro || LINEAR || — || align=right | 2.4 km || 
|-id=122 bgcolor=#fefefe
| 132122 ||  || — || February 11, 2002 || Socorro || LINEAR || V || align=right | 1.4 km || 
|-id=123 bgcolor=#fefefe
| 132123 ||  || — || February 10, 2002 || Socorro || LINEAR || — || align=right | 2.0 km || 
|-id=124 bgcolor=#FA8072
| 132124 ||  || — || February 10, 2002 || Socorro || LINEAR || PHO || align=right | 3.2 km || 
|-id=125 bgcolor=#fefefe
| 132125 ||  || — || February 11, 2002 || Socorro || LINEAR || — || align=right | 1.5 km || 
|-id=126 bgcolor=#fefefe
| 132126 ||  || — || February 11, 2002 || Socorro || LINEAR || NYS || align=right | 1.3 km || 
|-id=127 bgcolor=#fefefe
| 132127 ||  || — || February 11, 2002 || Socorro || LINEAR || V || align=right | 1.4 km || 
|-id=128 bgcolor=#fefefe
| 132128 ||  || — || February 11, 2002 || Socorro || LINEAR || NYS || align=right | 1.1 km || 
|-id=129 bgcolor=#fefefe
| 132129 ||  || — || February 11, 2002 || Socorro || LINEAR || — || align=right | 1.6 km || 
|-id=130 bgcolor=#fefefe
| 132130 ||  || — || February 13, 2002 || Socorro || LINEAR || — || align=right | 3.4 km || 
|-id=131 bgcolor=#fefefe
| 132131 ||  || — || February 15, 2002 || Kitt Peak || Spacewatch || NYS || align=right | 1.0 km || 
|-id=132 bgcolor=#fefefe
| 132132 ||  || — || February 15, 2002 || Socorro || LINEAR || NYS || align=right | 1.1 km || 
|-id=133 bgcolor=#fefefe
| 132133 ||  || — || February 15, 2002 || Socorro || LINEAR || EUT || align=right | 1.2 km || 
|-id=134 bgcolor=#fefefe
| 132134 ||  || — || February 14, 2002 || Haleakala || NEAT || — || align=right | 1.3 km || 
|-id=135 bgcolor=#fefefe
| 132135 ||  || — || February 15, 2002 || Socorro || LINEAR || — || align=right | 1.5 km || 
|-id=136 bgcolor=#fefefe
| 132136 ||  || — || February 3, 2002 || Palomar || NEAT || V || align=right | 1.2 km || 
|-id=137 bgcolor=#fefefe
| 132137 ||  || — || February 4, 2002 || Palomar || NEAT || FLO || align=right | 1.1 km || 
|-id=138 bgcolor=#fefefe
| 132138 ||  || — || February 6, 2002 || Anderson Mesa || LONEOS || — || align=right | 1.4 km || 
|-id=139 bgcolor=#fefefe
| 132139 ||  || — || February 7, 2002 || Socorro || LINEAR || V || align=right data-sort-value="0.97" | 970 m || 
|-id=140 bgcolor=#fefefe
| 132140 ||  || — || February 7, 2002 || Haleakala || NEAT || — || align=right | 1.1 km || 
|-id=141 bgcolor=#fefefe
| 132141 ||  || — || February 8, 2002 || Anderson Mesa || LONEOS || — || align=right | 1.4 km || 
|-id=142 bgcolor=#fefefe
| 132142 ||  || — || February 8, 2002 || Anderson Mesa || LONEOS || — || align=right | 1.7 km || 
|-id=143 bgcolor=#fefefe
| 132143 ||  || — || February 7, 2002 || Palomar || NEAT || — || align=right | 1.3 km || 
|-id=144 bgcolor=#fefefe
| 132144 ||  || — || February 7, 2002 || Haleakala || NEAT || NYS || align=right | 1.3 km || 
|-id=145 bgcolor=#fefefe
| 132145 ||  || — || February 8, 2002 || Kitt Peak || Spacewatch || NYS || align=right | 1.3 km || 
|-id=146 bgcolor=#fefefe
| 132146 ||  || — || February 8, 2002 || Kitt Peak || Spacewatch || — || align=right | 1.7 km || 
|-id=147 bgcolor=#fefefe
| 132147 ||  || — || February 9, 2002 || Kitt Peak || Spacewatch || NYS || align=right | 1.4 km || 
|-id=148 bgcolor=#E9E9E9
| 132148 ||  || — || February 9, 2002 || Kitt Peak || Spacewatch || GEF || align=right | 2.2 km || 
|-id=149 bgcolor=#fefefe
| 132149 ||  || — || February 9, 2002 || Kvistaberg || UDAS || NYS || align=right | 1.2 km || 
|-id=150 bgcolor=#fefefe
| 132150 ||  || — || February 9, 2002 || Kitt Peak || Spacewatch || NYS || align=right | 1.0 km || 
|-id=151 bgcolor=#fefefe
| 132151 ||  || — || February 11, 2002 || Socorro || LINEAR || NYS || align=right | 1.3 km || 
|-id=152 bgcolor=#fefefe
| 132152 ||  || — || February 11, 2002 || Socorro || LINEAR || NYS || align=right | 1.5 km || 
|-id=153 bgcolor=#fefefe
| 132153 ||  || — || February 8, 2002 || Socorro || LINEAR || V || align=right | 1.2 km || 
|-id=154 bgcolor=#fefefe
| 132154 ||  || — || February 8, 2002 || Socorro || LINEAR || FLO || align=right | 1.9 km || 
|-id=155 bgcolor=#fefefe
| 132155 ||  || — || February 7, 2002 || Palomar || NEAT || — || align=right | 1.9 km || 
|-id=156 bgcolor=#fefefe
| 132156 ||  || — || February 10, 2002 || Socorro || LINEAR || NYS || align=right | 1.1 km || 
|-id=157 bgcolor=#fefefe
| 132157 ||  || — || February 20, 2002 || Kitt Peak || Spacewatch || NYS || align=right | 1.5 km || 
|-id=158 bgcolor=#fefefe
| 132158 ||  || — || February 20, 2002 || Socorro || LINEAR || MAS || align=right | 1.5 km || 
|-id=159 bgcolor=#fefefe
| 132159 ||  || — || March 8, 2002 || Ondřejov || P. Pravec, P. Kušnirák || V || align=right | 1.1 km || 
|-id=160 bgcolor=#E9E9E9
| 132160 ||  || — || March 8, 2002 || Kleť || Kleť Obs. || — || align=right | 1.4 km || 
|-id=161 bgcolor=#fefefe
| 132161 ||  || — || March 6, 2002 || Siding Spring || R. H. McNaught || — || align=right | 1.2 km || 
|-id=162 bgcolor=#E9E9E9
| 132162 ||  || — || March 7, 2002 || Cima Ekar || ADAS || — || align=right | 1.9 km || 
|-id=163 bgcolor=#fefefe
| 132163 ||  || — || March 14, 2002 || Prescott || P. G. Comba || NYS || align=right | 1.1 km || 
|-id=164 bgcolor=#fefefe
| 132164 ||  || — || March 14, 2002 || Socorro || LINEAR || — || align=right | 2.3 km || 
|-id=165 bgcolor=#fefefe
| 132165 ||  || — || March 3, 2002 || Haleakala || NEAT || — || align=right | 1.6 km || 
|-id=166 bgcolor=#fefefe
| 132166 ||  || — || March 3, 2002 || Haleakala || NEAT || NYS || align=right | 1.2 km || 
|-id=167 bgcolor=#fefefe
| 132167 ||  || — || March 5, 2002 || Kitt Peak || Spacewatch || — || align=right | 1.4 km || 
|-id=168 bgcolor=#fefefe
| 132168 ||  || — || March 6, 2002 || Palomar || NEAT || — || align=right | 1.6 km || 
|-id=169 bgcolor=#fefefe
| 132169 ||  || — || March 9, 2002 || Socorro || LINEAR || NYS || align=right | 1.7 km || 
|-id=170 bgcolor=#fefefe
| 132170 ||  || — || March 10, 2002 || Haleakala || NEAT || — || align=right | 1.5 km || 
|-id=171 bgcolor=#fefefe
| 132171 ||  || — || March 10, 2002 || Haleakala || NEAT || — || align=right | 1.7 km || 
|-id=172 bgcolor=#fefefe
| 132172 ||  || — || March 10, 2002 || Haleakala || NEAT || — || align=right | 1.4 km || 
|-id=173 bgcolor=#fefefe
| 132173 ||  || — || March 10, 2002 || Haleakala || NEAT || — || align=right | 1.5 km || 
|-id=174 bgcolor=#fefefe
| 132174 ||  || — || March 10, 2002 || Haleakala || NEAT || V || align=right | 1.6 km || 
|-id=175 bgcolor=#fefefe
| 132175 ||  || — || March 5, 2002 || Kitt Peak || Spacewatch || NYS || align=right | 1.5 km || 
|-id=176 bgcolor=#fefefe
| 132176 ||  || — || March 10, 2002 || Anderson Mesa || LONEOS || ERI || align=right | 2.6 km || 
|-id=177 bgcolor=#fefefe
| 132177 ||  || — || March 10, 2002 || Anderson Mesa || LONEOS || — || align=right | 1.8 km || 
|-id=178 bgcolor=#fefefe
| 132178 ||  || — || March 9, 2002 || Socorro || LINEAR || MAS || align=right | 1.3 km || 
|-id=179 bgcolor=#fefefe
| 132179 ||  || — || March 9, 2002 || Socorro || LINEAR || NYS || align=right | 1.0 km || 
|-id=180 bgcolor=#fefefe
| 132180 ||  || — || March 9, 2002 || Socorro || LINEAR || MAS || align=right | 1.5 km || 
|-id=181 bgcolor=#fefefe
| 132181 ||  || — || March 9, 2002 || Socorro || LINEAR || MAS || align=right | 1.4 km || 
|-id=182 bgcolor=#fefefe
| 132182 ||  || — || March 9, 2002 || Socorro || LINEAR || — || align=right | 1.3 km || 
|-id=183 bgcolor=#fefefe
| 132183 ||  || — || March 9, 2002 || Socorro || LINEAR || NYS || align=right | 1.2 km || 
|-id=184 bgcolor=#fefefe
| 132184 ||  || — || March 9, 2002 || Socorro || LINEAR || NYS || align=right | 1.1 km || 
|-id=185 bgcolor=#fefefe
| 132185 ||  || — || March 9, 2002 || Socorro || LINEAR || — || align=right | 1.5 km || 
|-id=186 bgcolor=#fefefe
| 132186 ||  || — || March 9, 2002 || Socorro || LINEAR || — || align=right | 1.6 km || 
|-id=187 bgcolor=#fefefe
| 132187 ||  || — || March 9, 2002 || Socorro || LINEAR || MAS || align=right | 1.8 km || 
|-id=188 bgcolor=#fefefe
| 132188 ||  || — || March 9, 2002 || Socorro || LINEAR || — || align=right | 1.4 km || 
|-id=189 bgcolor=#fefefe
| 132189 ||  || — || March 9, 2002 || Socorro || LINEAR || V || align=right | 1.2 km || 
|-id=190 bgcolor=#E9E9E9
| 132190 ||  || — || March 11, 2002 || Palomar || NEAT || — || align=right | 2.8 km || 
|-id=191 bgcolor=#fefefe
| 132191 ||  || — || March 9, 2002 || Kitt Peak || Spacewatch || NYS || align=right | 1.5 km || 
|-id=192 bgcolor=#fefefe
| 132192 ||  || — || March 9, 2002 || Socorro || LINEAR || — || align=right | 1.7 km || 
|-id=193 bgcolor=#fefefe
| 132193 ||  || — || March 9, 2002 || Socorro || LINEAR || — || align=right | 1.4 km || 
|-id=194 bgcolor=#fefefe
| 132194 ||  || — || March 12, 2002 || Socorro || LINEAR || V || align=right | 1.6 km || 
|-id=195 bgcolor=#fefefe
| 132195 ||  || — || March 12, 2002 || Socorro || LINEAR || — || align=right | 1.3 km || 
|-id=196 bgcolor=#fefefe
| 132196 ||  || — || March 12, 2002 || Socorro || LINEAR || — || align=right | 1.3 km || 
|-id=197 bgcolor=#fefefe
| 132197 ||  || — || March 10, 2002 || Haleakala || NEAT || FLO || align=right data-sort-value="0.96" | 960 m || 
|-id=198 bgcolor=#fefefe
| 132198 ||  || — || March 10, 2002 || Haleakala || NEAT || MAS || align=right | 1.0 km || 
|-id=199 bgcolor=#fefefe
| 132199 ||  || — || March 10, 2002 || Haleakala || NEAT || — || align=right | 1.8 km || 
|-id=200 bgcolor=#fefefe
| 132200 ||  || — || March 11, 2002 || Palomar || NEAT || — || align=right | 1.3 km || 
|}

132201–132300 

|-bgcolor=#fefefe
| 132201 ||  || — || March 12, 2002 || Palomar || NEAT || V || align=right | 1.3 km || 
|-id=202 bgcolor=#fefefe
| 132202 ||  || — || March 9, 2002 || Socorro || LINEAR || NYS || align=right | 1.3 km || 
|-id=203 bgcolor=#fefefe
| 132203 ||  || — || March 9, 2002 || Socorro || LINEAR || — || align=right | 1.4 km || 
|-id=204 bgcolor=#fefefe
| 132204 ||  || — || March 13, 2002 || Socorro || LINEAR || V || align=right | 1.1 km || 
|-id=205 bgcolor=#E9E9E9
| 132205 ||  || — || March 13, 2002 || Socorro || LINEAR || — || align=right | 1.9 km || 
|-id=206 bgcolor=#fefefe
| 132206 ||  || — || March 13, 2002 || Socorro || LINEAR || — || align=right | 1.4 km || 
|-id=207 bgcolor=#fefefe
| 132207 ||  || — || March 13, 2002 || Socorro || LINEAR || — || align=right | 1.4 km || 
|-id=208 bgcolor=#fefefe
| 132208 ||  || — || March 13, 2002 || Socorro || LINEAR || NYS || align=right | 1.9 km || 
|-id=209 bgcolor=#fefefe
| 132209 ||  || — || March 13, 2002 || Socorro || LINEAR || MAS || align=right | 1.0 km || 
|-id=210 bgcolor=#fefefe
| 132210 ||  || — || March 13, 2002 || Socorro || LINEAR || — || align=right | 1.4 km || 
|-id=211 bgcolor=#E9E9E9
| 132211 ||  || — || March 13, 2002 || Socorro || LINEAR || — || align=right | 1.7 km || 
|-id=212 bgcolor=#fefefe
| 132212 ||  || — || March 13, 2002 || Socorro || LINEAR || NYS || align=right | 1.2 km || 
|-id=213 bgcolor=#fefefe
| 132213 ||  || — || March 13, 2002 || Socorro || LINEAR || NYS || align=right | 1.6 km || 
|-id=214 bgcolor=#fefefe
| 132214 ||  || — || March 13, 2002 || Socorro || LINEAR || V || align=right | 1.2 km || 
|-id=215 bgcolor=#fefefe
| 132215 ||  || — || March 13, 2002 || Socorro || LINEAR || V || align=right | 1.2 km || 
|-id=216 bgcolor=#E9E9E9
| 132216 ||  || — || March 13, 2002 || Socorro || LINEAR || — || align=right | 2.4 km || 
|-id=217 bgcolor=#E9E9E9
| 132217 ||  || — || March 13, 2002 || Socorro || LINEAR || HEN || align=right | 1.8 km || 
|-id=218 bgcolor=#fefefe
| 132218 ||  || — || March 13, 2002 || Socorro || LINEAR || — || align=right | 1.3 km || 
|-id=219 bgcolor=#fefefe
| 132219 ||  || — || March 13, 2002 || Socorro || LINEAR || — || align=right | 1.4 km || 
|-id=220 bgcolor=#fefefe
| 132220 ||  || — || March 13, 2002 || Socorro || LINEAR || MAS || align=right | 1.3 km || 
|-id=221 bgcolor=#fefefe
| 132221 ||  || — || March 13, 2002 || Socorro || LINEAR || V || align=right | 1.3 km || 
|-id=222 bgcolor=#fefefe
| 132222 ||  || — || March 13, 2002 || Socorro || LINEAR || MAS || align=right | 1.3 km || 
|-id=223 bgcolor=#fefefe
| 132223 ||  || — || March 13, 2002 || Socorro || LINEAR || NYS || align=right | 1.5 km || 
|-id=224 bgcolor=#fefefe
| 132224 ||  || — || March 13, 2002 || Socorro || LINEAR || NYS || align=right | 1.4 km || 
|-id=225 bgcolor=#fefefe
| 132225 ||  || — || March 13, 2002 || Socorro || LINEAR || MAS || align=right | 1.6 km || 
|-id=226 bgcolor=#fefefe
| 132226 ||  || — || March 13, 2002 || Socorro || LINEAR || NYS || align=right | 1.1 km || 
|-id=227 bgcolor=#fefefe
| 132227 ||  || — || March 13, 2002 || Socorro || LINEAR || NYS || align=right | 1.3 km || 
|-id=228 bgcolor=#fefefe
| 132228 ||  || — || March 13, 2002 || Socorro || LINEAR || MAS || align=right | 1.1 km || 
|-id=229 bgcolor=#fefefe
| 132229 ||  || — || March 13, 2002 || Socorro || LINEAR || V || align=right | 1.6 km || 
|-id=230 bgcolor=#fefefe
| 132230 ||  || — || March 13, 2002 || Socorro || LINEAR || — || align=right | 3.4 km || 
|-id=231 bgcolor=#E9E9E9
| 132231 ||  || — || March 13, 2002 || Socorro || LINEAR || MAR || align=right | 1.8 km || 
|-id=232 bgcolor=#fefefe
| 132232 ||  || — || March 13, 2002 || Socorro || LINEAR || NYS || align=right | 1.3 km || 
|-id=233 bgcolor=#fefefe
| 132233 ||  || — || March 13, 2002 || Socorro || LINEAR || NYS || align=right | 1.3 km || 
|-id=234 bgcolor=#fefefe
| 132234 ||  || — || March 14, 2002 || Palomar || NEAT || — || align=right | 1.4 km || 
|-id=235 bgcolor=#fefefe
| 132235 ||  || — || March 10, 2002 || Haleakala || NEAT || — || align=right | 1.6 km || 
|-id=236 bgcolor=#fefefe
| 132236 ||  || — || March 10, 2002 || Haleakala || NEAT || V || align=right | 1.3 km || 
|-id=237 bgcolor=#fefefe
| 132237 ||  || — || March 10, 2002 || Haleakala || NEAT || — || align=right | 1.7 km || 
|-id=238 bgcolor=#E9E9E9
| 132238 ||  || — || March 12, 2002 || Palomar || NEAT || — || align=right | 2.8 km || 
|-id=239 bgcolor=#fefefe
| 132239 ||  || — || March 12, 2002 || Palomar || NEAT || NYS || align=right | 1.6 km || 
|-id=240 bgcolor=#fefefe
| 132240 ||  || — || March 13, 2002 || Palomar || NEAT || — || align=right | 1.3 km || 
|-id=241 bgcolor=#fefefe
| 132241 ||  || — || March 9, 2002 || Socorro || LINEAR || MAS || align=right | 1.1 km || 
|-id=242 bgcolor=#fefefe
| 132242 ||  || — || March 9, 2002 || Socorro || LINEAR || MAS || align=right | 1.2 km || 
|-id=243 bgcolor=#fefefe
| 132243 ||  || — || March 9, 2002 || Socorro || LINEAR || NYS || align=right | 1.3 km || 
|-id=244 bgcolor=#fefefe
| 132244 ||  || — || March 9, 2002 || Socorro || LINEAR || NYS || align=right | 1.5 km || 
|-id=245 bgcolor=#fefefe
| 132245 ||  || — || March 9, 2002 || Socorro || LINEAR || MAS || align=right | 1.3 km || 
|-id=246 bgcolor=#E9E9E9
| 132246 ||  || — || March 9, 2002 || Socorro || LINEAR || — || align=right | 1.8 km || 
|-id=247 bgcolor=#fefefe
| 132247 ||  || — || March 9, 2002 || Socorro || LINEAR || MAS || align=right | 1.3 km || 
|-id=248 bgcolor=#fefefe
| 132248 ||  || — || March 12, 2002 || Socorro || LINEAR || CLA || align=right | 3.7 km || 
|-id=249 bgcolor=#fefefe
| 132249 ||  || — || March 13, 2002 || Socorro || LINEAR || V || align=right | 1.4 km || 
|-id=250 bgcolor=#fefefe
| 132250 ||  || — || March 14, 2002 || Socorro || LINEAR || MAS || align=right | 1.4 km || 
|-id=251 bgcolor=#fefefe
| 132251 ||  || — || March 14, 2002 || Socorro || LINEAR || NYS || align=right | 1.4 km || 
|-id=252 bgcolor=#fefefe
| 132252 ||  || — || March 12, 2002 || Socorro || LINEAR || — || align=right | 1.5 km || 
|-id=253 bgcolor=#fefefe
| 132253 ||  || — || March 5, 2002 || Haleakala || NEAT || — || align=right | 1.6 km || 
|-id=254 bgcolor=#fefefe
| 132254 ||  || — || March 6, 2002 || Socorro || LINEAR || V || align=right | 1.1 km || 
|-id=255 bgcolor=#fefefe
| 132255 ||  || — || March 9, 2002 || Anderson Mesa || LONEOS || ERI || align=right | 2.5 km || 
|-id=256 bgcolor=#fefefe
| 132256 ||  || — || March 9, 2002 || Anderson Mesa || LONEOS || V || align=right | 1.2 km || 
|-id=257 bgcolor=#fefefe
| 132257 ||  || — || March 9, 2002 || Anderson Mesa || LONEOS || V || align=right | 1.3 km || 
|-id=258 bgcolor=#fefefe
| 132258 ||  || — || March 10, 2002 || Kitt Peak || Spacewatch || NYS || align=right | 1.3 km || 
|-id=259 bgcolor=#fefefe
| 132259 ||  || — || March 10, 2002 || Anderson Mesa || LONEOS || V || align=right | 1.4 km || 
|-id=260 bgcolor=#fefefe
| 132260 ||  || — || March 9, 2002 || Kitt Peak || Spacewatch || NYS || align=right data-sort-value="0.93" | 930 m || 
|-id=261 bgcolor=#fefefe
| 132261 ||  || — || March 10, 2002 || Kitt Peak || Spacewatch || — || align=right | 1.5 km || 
|-id=262 bgcolor=#fefefe
| 132262 ||  || — || March 12, 2002 || Palomar || NEAT || MAS || align=right | 1.2 km || 
|-id=263 bgcolor=#fefefe
| 132263 ||  || — || March 12, 2002 || Kitt Peak || Spacewatch || NYS || align=right | 2.8 km || 
|-id=264 bgcolor=#fefefe
| 132264 ||  || — || March 12, 2002 || Kitt Peak || Spacewatch || NYS || align=right | 1.3 km || 
|-id=265 bgcolor=#fefefe
| 132265 ||  || — || March 11, 2002 || Cima Ekar || ADAS || NYS || align=right | 1.1 km || 
|-id=266 bgcolor=#fefefe
| 132266 ||  || — || March 12, 2002 || Palomar || NEAT || — || align=right | 1.5 km || 
|-id=267 bgcolor=#fefefe
| 132267 ||  || — || March 13, 2002 || Socorro || LINEAR || NYS || align=right | 1.3 km || 
|-id=268 bgcolor=#fefefe
| 132268 ||  || — || March 13, 2002 || Socorro || LINEAR || MAS || align=right | 1.1 km || 
|-id=269 bgcolor=#fefefe
| 132269 ||  || — || March 13, 2002 || Palomar || NEAT || MAS || align=right | 1.1 km || 
|-id=270 bgcolor=#fefefe
| 132270 ||  || — || March 12, 2002 || Palomar || NEAT || MAS || align=right | 1.4 km || 
|-id=271 bgcolor=#fefefe
| 132271 ||  || — || March 12, 2002 || Palomar || NEAT || — || align=right | 1.6 km || 
|-id=272 bgcolor=#fefefe
| 132272 ||  || — || March 12, 2002 || Palomar || NEAT || MAS || align=right | 1.6 km || 
|-id=273 bgcolor=#fefefe
| 132273 ||  || — || March 12, 2002 || Palomar || NEAT || NYS || align=right data-sort-value="0.95" | 950 m || 
|-id=274 bgcolor=#E9E9E9
| 132274 ||  || — || March 13, 2002 || Socorro || LINEAR || — || align=right | 3.8 km || 
|-id=275 bgcolor=#E9E9E9
| 132275 ||  || — || March 13, 2002 || Socorro || LINEAR || — || align=right | 1.6 km || 
|-id=276 bgcolor=#fefefe
| 132276 ||  || — || March 15, 2002 || Palomar || NEAT || MAS || align=right | 1.2 km || 
|-id=277 bgcolor=#fefefe
| 132277 ||  || — || March 15, 2002 || Palomar || NEAT || — || align=right | 2.1 km || 
|-id=278 bgcolor=#fefefe
| 132278 ||  || — || March 14, 2002 || Palomar || NEAT || — || align=right | 2.6 km || 
|-id=279 bgcolor=#fefefe
| 132279 ||  || — || March 5, 2002 || Anderson Mesa || LONEOS || FLO || align=right data-sort-value="0.97" | 970 m || 
|-id=280 bgcolor=#fefefe
| 132280 ||  || — || March 16, 2002 || Nogales || Tenagra II Obs. || NYS || align=right | 1.5 km || 
|-id=281 bgcolor=#fefefe
| 132281 ||  || — || March 16, 2002 || Socorro || LINEAR || — || align=right | 1.4 km || 
|-id=282 bgcolor=#E9E9E9
| 132282 ||  || — || March 16, 2002 || Socorro || LINEAR || HEN || align=right | 3.8 km || 
|-id=283 bgcolor=#fefefe
| 132283 ||  || — || March 16, 2002 || Socorro || LINEAR || NYS || align=right data-sort-value="0.93" | 930 m || 
|-id=284 bgcolor=#fefefe
| 132284 ||  || — || March 16, 2002 || Haleakala || NEAT || — || align=right | 1.7 km || 
|-id=285 bgcolor=#fefefe
| 132285 ||  || — || March 16, 2002 || Socorro || LINEAR || — || align=right | 1.7 km || 
|-id=286 bgcolor=#fefefe
| 132286 ||  || — || March 16, 2002 || Socorro || LINEAR || — || align=right | 1.5 km || 
|-id=287 bgcolor=#E9E9E9
| 132287 ||  || — || March 16, 2002 || Haleakala || NEAT || — || align=right | 2.1 km || 
|-id=288 bgcolor=#fefefe
| 132288 ||  || — || March 18, 2002 || Haleakala || NEAT || V || align=right | 1.2 km || 
|-id=289 bgcolor=#fefefe
| 132289 ||  || — || March 19, 2002 || Socorro || LINEAR || V || align=right | 1.4 km || 
|-id=290 bgcolor=#fefefe
| 132290 ||  || — || March 19, 2002 || Socorro || LINEAR || KLI || align=right | 4.4 km || 
|-id=291 bgcolor=#E9E9E9
| 132291 ||  || — || March 19, 2002 || Anderson Mesa || LONEOS || — || align=right | 1.6 km || 
|-id=292 bgcolor=#E9E9E9
| 132292 ||  || — || March 21, 2002 || Palomar || NEAT || — || align=right | 1.6 km || 
|-id=293 bgcolor=#fefefe
| 132293 ||  || — || March 20, 2002 || Socorro || LINEAR || — || align=right | 1.3 km || 
|-id=294 bgcolor=#E9E9E9
| 132294 ||  || — || March 21, 2002 || Kitt Peak || Spacewatch || — || align=right | 3.4 km || 
|-id=295 bgcolor=#E9E9E9
| 132295 || 2002 GC || — || April 1, 2002 || Palomar || NEAT || MAR || align=right | 2.3 km || 
|-id=296 bgcolor=#fefefe
| 132296 ||  || — || April 4, 2002 || Emerald Lane || L. Ball || V || align=right | 1.1 km || 
|-id=297 bgcolor=#E9E9E9
| 132297 ||  || — || April 3, 2002 || Drebach || G. Lehmann, J. Kandler || — || align=right | 1.6 km || 
|-id=298 bgcolor=#fefefe
| 132298 ||  || — || April 6, 2002 || Emerald Lane || L. Ball || NYS || align=right | 1.9 km || 
|-id=299 bgcolor=#E9E9E9
| 132299 ||  || — || April 4, 2002 || Palomar || NEAT || HNS || align=right | 1.8 km || 
|-id=300 bgcolor=#fefefe
| 132300 ||  || — || April 12, 2002 || Socorro || LINEAR || CHL || align=right | 4.7 km || 
|}

132301–132400 

|-bgcolor=#fefefe
| 132301 ||  || — || April 14, 2002 || Desert Eagle || W. K. Y. Yeung || — || align=right | 1.5 km || 
|-id=302 bgcolor=#E9E9E9
| 132302 ||  || — || April 14, 2002 || Desert Eagle || W. K. Y. Yeung || — || align=right | 2.8 km || 
|-id=303 bgcolor=#E9E9E9
| 132303 ||  || — || April 14, 2002 || Palomar || NEAT || — || align=right | 2.9 km || 
|-id=304 bgcolor=#E9E9E9
| 132304 ||  || — || April 15, 2002 || Desert Eagle || W. K. Y. Yeung || — || align=right | 1.7 km || 
|-id=305 bgcolor=#E9E9E9
| 132305 ||  || — || April 14, 2002 || Desert Eagle || W. K. Y. Yeung || — || align=right | 3.8 km || 
|-id=306 bgcolor=#E9E9E9
| 132306 ||  || — || April 14, 2002 || Desert Eagle || W. K. Y. Yeung || — || align=right | 2.7 km || 
|-id=307 bgcolor=#fefefe
| 132307 ||  || — || April 15, 2002 || Desert Eagle || W. K. Y. Yeung || — || align=right | 1.6 km || 
|-id=308 bgcolor=#fefefe
| 132308 ||  || — || April 14, 2002 || Socorro || LINEAR || MAS || align=right | 1.5 km || 
|-id=309 bgcolor=#fefefe
| 132309 ||  || — || April 14, 2002 || Socorro || LINEAR || NYS || align=right | 1.2 km || 
|-id=310 bgcolor=#E9E9E9
| 132310 ||  || — || April 14, 2002 || Socorro || LINEAR || — || align=right | 1.5 km || 
|-id=311 bgcolor=#fefefe
| 132311 ||  || — || April 14, 2002 || Socorro || LINEAR || MAS || align=right | 1.4 km || 
|-id=312 bgcolor=#E9E9E9
| 132312 ||  || — || April 15, 2002 || Socorro || LINEAR || — || align=right | 2.5 km || 
|-id=313 bgcolor=#fefefe
| 132313 ||  || — || April 15, 2002 || Socorro || LINEAR || — || align=right | 1.8 km || 
|-id=314 bgcolor=#fefefe
| 132314 ||  || — || April 15, 2002 || Socorro || LINEAR || — || align=right | 1.6 km || 
|-id=315 bgcolor=#fefefe
| 132315 ||  || — || April 15, 2002 || Socorro || LINEAR || MAS || align=right | 1.2 km || 
|-id=316 bgcolor=#E9E9E9
| 132316 ||  || — || April 15, 2002 || Socorro || LINEAR || — || align=right | 2.0 km || 
|-id=317 bgcolor=#E9E9E9
| 132317 ||  || — || April 14, 2002 || Socorro || LINEAR || — || align=right | 2.1 km || 
|-id=318 bgcolor=#E9E9E9
| 132318 ||  || — || April 14, 2002 || Socorro || LINEAR || — || align=right | 1.8 km || 
|-id=319 bgcolor=#fefefe
| 132319 ||  || — || April 14, 2002 || Socorro || LINEAR || NYS || align=right | 1.4 km || 
|-id=320 bgcolor=#E9E9E9
| 132320 ||  || — || April 14, 2002 || Socorro || LINEAR || — || align=right | 1.8 km || 
|-id=321 bgcolor=#E9E9E9
| 132321 ||  || — || April 14, 2002 || Socorro || LINEAR || — || align=right | 2.1 km || 
|-id=322 bgcolor=#fefefe
| 132322 ||  || — || April 14, 2002 || Socorro || LINEAR || — || align=right | 1.4 km || 
|-id=323 bgcolor=#E9E9E9
| 132323 ||  || — || April 14, 2002 || Socorro || LINEAR || MAR || align=right | 1.9 km || 
|-id=324 bgcolor=#E9E9E9
| 132324 ||  || — || April 14, 2002 || Socorro || LINEAR || — || align=right | 4.1 km || 
|-id=325 bgcolor=#fefefe
| 132325 ||  || — || April 15, 2002 || Palomar || NEAT || — || align=right | 1.4 km || 
|-id=326 bgcolor=#fefefe
| 132326 ||  || — || April 15, 2002 || Palomar || NEAT || V || align=right | 1.1 km || 
|-id=327 bgcolor=#E9E9E9
| 132327 ||  || — || April 15, 2002 || Palomar || NEAT || — || align=right | 1.8 km || 
|-id=328 bgcolor=#fefefe
| 132328 ||  || — || April 11, 2002 || Palomar || NEAT || — || align=right | 3.3 km || 
|-id=329 bgcolor=#E9E9E9
| 132329 ||  || — || April 7, 2002 || Cerro Tololo || M. W. Buie || — || align=right | 4.1 km || 
|-id=330 bgcolor=#E9E9E9
| 132330 ||  || — || April 1, 2002 || Palomar || NEAT || — || align=right | 3.9 km || 
|-id=331 bgcolor=#fefefe
| 132331 ||  || — || April 1, 2002 || Palomar || NEAT || — || align=right | 1.9 km || 
|-id=332 bgcolor=#fefefe
| 132332 ||  || — || April 3, 2002 || Kitt Peak || Spacewatch || NYS || align=right | 1.3 km || 
|-id=333 bgcolor=#fefefe
| 132333 ||  || — || April 1, 2002 || Palomar || NEAT || — || align=right | 1.4 km || 
|-id=334 bgcolor=#E9E9E9
| 132334 ||  || — || April 2, 2002 || Kitt Peak || Spacewatch || — || align=right | 2.3 km || 
|-id=335 bgcolor=#fefefe
| 132335 ||  || — || April 2, 2002 || Kitt Peak || Spacewatch || — || align=right | 2.1 km || 
|-id=336 bgcolor=#fefefe
| 132336 ||  || — || April 4, 2002 || Palomar || NEAT || FLO || align=right | 1.5 km || 
|-id=337 bgcolor=#E9E9E9
| 132337 ||  || — || April 4, 2002 || Palomar || NEAT || — || align=right | 2.0 km || 
|-id=338 bgcolor=#E9E9E9
| 132338 ||  || — || April 4, 2002 || Palomar || NEAT || — || align=right | 1.9 km || 
|-id=339 bgcolor=#E9E9E9
| 132339 ||  || — || April 4, 2002 || Palomar || NEAT || — || align=right | 1.6 km || 
|-id=340 bgcolor=#E9E9E9
| 132340 ||  || — || April 4, 2002 || Palomar || NEAT || — || align=right | 4.0 km || 
|-id=341 bgcolor=#E9E9E9
| 132341 ||  || — || April 4, 2002 || Haleakala || NEAT || — || align=right | 3.6 km || 
|-id=342 bgcolor=#fefefe
| 132342 ||  || — || April 4, 2002 || Palomar || NEAT || FLO || align=right | 1.2 km || 
|-id=343 bgcolor=#E9E9E9
| 132343 ||  || — || April 4, 2002 || Palomar || NEAT || — || align=right | 1.3 km || 
|-id=344 bgcolor=#E9E9E9
| 132344 ||  || — || April 4, 2002 || Palomar || NEAT || RAF || align=right | 1.5 km || 
|-id=345 bgcolor=#fefefe
| 132345 ||  || — || April 4, 2002 || Haleakala || NEAT || — || align=right | 1.6 km || 
|-id=346 bgcolor=#fefefe
| 132346 ||  || — || April 4, 2002 || Haleakala || NEAT || — || align=right | 1.7 km || 
|-id=347 bgcolor=#fefefe
| 132347 ||  || — || April 2, 2002 || Palomar || NEAT || V || align=right | 1.4 km || 
|-id=348 bgcolor=#fefefe
| 132348 ||  || — || April 4, 2002 || Palomar || NEAT || NYS || align=right | 1.8 km || 
|-id=349 bgcolor=#fefefe
| 132349 ||  || — || April 5, 2002 || Palomar || NEAT || — || align=right | 2.9 km || 
|-id=350 bgcolor=#fefefe
| 132350 ||  || — || April 5, 2002 || Anderson Mesa || LONEOS || — || align=right | 1.4 km || 
|-id=351 bgcolor=#E9E9E9
| 132351 ||  || — || April 5, 2002 || Anderson Mesa || LONEOS || — || align=right | 1.5 km || 
|-id=352 bgcolor=#fefefe
| 132352 ||  || — || April 5, 2002 || Kitt Peak || Spacewatch || SVE || align=right | 3.4 km || 
|-id=353 bgcolor=#fefefe
| 132353 ||  || — || April 5, 2002 || Anderson Mesa || LONEOS || MAS || align=right | 1.5 km || 
|-id=354 bgcolor=#E9E9E9
| 132354 ||  || — || April 5, 2002 || Anderson Mesa || LONEOS || — || align=right | 2.0 km || 
|-id=355 bgcolor=#E9E9E9
| 132355 ||  || — || April 8, 2002 || Palomar || NEAT || — || align=right | 2.2 km || 
|-id=356 bgcolor=#fefefe
| 132356 ||  || — || April 8, 2002 || Palomar || NEAT || — || align=right | 1.4 km || 
|-id=357 bgcolor=#fefefe
| 132357 ||  || — || April 8, 2002 || Kitt Peak || Spacewatch || — || align=right | 1.6 km || 
|-id=358 bgcolor=#d6d6d6
| 132358 ||  || — || April 8, 2002 || Palomar || NEAT || — || align=right | 4.5 km || 
|-id=359 bgcolor=#E9E9E9
| 132359 ||  || — || April 8, 2002 || Palomar || NEAT || EUN || align=right | 2.0 km || 
|-id=360 bgcolor=#E9E9E9
| 132360 ||  || — || April 8, 2002 || Palomar || NEAT || MIS || align=right | 4.2 km || 
|-id=361 bgcolor=#fefefe
| 132361 ||  || — || April 8, 2002 || Palomar || NEAT || — || align=right | 2.0 km || 
|-id=362 bgcolor=#fefefe
| 132362 ||  || — || April 8, 2002 || Palomar || NEAT || NYS || align=right | 1.3 km || 
|-id=363 bgcolor=#d6d6d6
| 132363 ||  || — || April 8, 2002 || Palomar || NEAT || — || align=right | 4.8 km || 
|-id=364 bgcolor=#E9E9E9
| 132364 ||  || — || April 8, 2002 || Palomar || NEAT || — || align=right | 1.5 km || 
|-id=365 bgcolor=#fefefe
| 132365 ||  || — || April 8, 2002 || Kitt Peak || Spacewatch || NYS || align=right | 1.5 km || 
|-id=366 bgcolor=#fefefe
| 132366 ||  || — || April 8, 2002 || Socorro || LINEAR || — || align=right | 2.0 km || 
|-id=367 bgcolor=#E9E9E9
| 132367 ||  || — || April 8, 2002 || Socorro || LINEAR || JUN || align=right | 1.8 km || 
|-id=368 bgcolor=#E9E9E9
| 132368 ||  || — || April 8, 2002 || Socorro || LINEAR || EUN || align=right | 2.1 km || 
|-id=369 bgcolor=#E9E9E9
| 132369 ||  || — || April 8, 2002 || Palomar || NEAT || — || align=right | 4.8 km || 
|-id=370 bgcolor=#E9E9E9
| 132370 ||  || — || April 9, 2002 || Anderson Mesa || LONEOS || AGN || align=right | 2.3 km || 
|-id=371 bgcolor=#fefefe
| 132371 ||  || — || April 9, 2002 || Anderson Mesa || LONEOS || V || align=right | 1.0 km || 
|-id=372 bgcolor=#fefefe
| 132372 ||  || — || April 9, 2002 || Kitt Peak || Spacewatch || V || align=right | 1.2 km || 
|-id=373 bgcolor=#E9E9E9
| 132373 ||  || — || April 9, 2002 || Socorro || LINEAR || — || align=right | 5.2 km || 
|-id=374 bgcolor=#fefefe
| 132374 ||  || — || April 9, 2002 || Anderson Mesa || LONEOS || — || align=right | 1.6 km || 
|-id=375 bgcolor=#fefefe
| 132375 ||  || — || April 9, 2002 || Socorro || LINEAR || V || align=right | 1.2 km || 
|-id=376 bgcolor=#E9E9E9
| 132376 ||  || — || April 9, 2002 || Socorro || LINEAR || — || align=right | 1.3 km || 
|-id=377 bgcolor=#fefefe
| 132377 ||  || — || April 10, 2002 || Socorro || LINEAR || NYS || align=right | 1.5 km || 
|-id=378 bgcolor=#E9E9E9
| 132378 ||  || — || April 10, 2002 || Socorro || LINEAR || — || align=right | 3.7 km || 
|-id=379 bgcolor=#E9E9E9
| 132379 ||  || — || April 10, 2002 || Socorro || LINEAR || — || align=right | 3.0 km || 
|-id=380 bgcolor=#fefefe
| 132380 ||  || — || April 10, 2002 || Socorro || LINEAR || V || align=right data-sort-value="0.96" | 960 m || 
|-id=381 bgcolor=#fefefe
| 132381 ||  || — || April 10, 2002 || Socorro || LINEAR || — || align=right | 1.8 km || 
|-id=382 bgcolor=#fefefe
| 132382 ||  || — || April 10, 2002 || Socorro || LINEAR || — || align=right | 1.6 km || 
|-id=383 bgcolor=#fefefe
| 132383 ||  || — || April 10, 2002 || Socorro || LINEAR || ERI || align=right | 1.8 km || 
|-id=384 bgcolor=#E9E9E9
| 132384 ||  || — || April 10, 2002 || Socorro || LINEAR || — || align=right | 4.5 km || 
|-id=385 bgcolor=#fefefe
| 132385 ||  || — || April 10, 2002 || Socorro || LINEAR || — || align=right | 1.9 km || 
|-id=386 bgcolor=#fefefe
| 132386 ||  || — || April 10, 2002 || Socorro || LINEAR || V || align=right | 1.1 km || 
|-id=387 bgcolor=#E9E9E9
| 132387 ||  || — || April 10, 2002 || Socorro || LINEAR || EUN || align=right | 2.1 km || 
|-id=388 bgcolor=#fefefe
| 132388 ||  || — || April 10, 2002 || Socorro || LINEAR || — || align=right | 1.5 km || 
|-id=389 bgcolor=#E9E9E9
| 132389 ||  || — || April 8, 2002 || Palomar || NEAT || — || align=right | 1.8 km || 
|-id=390 bgcolor=#fefefe
| 132390 ||  || — || April 9, 2002 || Anderson Mesa || LONEOS || — || align=right | 1.4 km || 
|-id=391 bgcolor=#E9E9E9
| 132391 ||  || — || April 9, 2002 || Palomar || NEAT || — || align=right | 2.4 km || 
|-id=392 bgcolor=#E9E9E9
| 132392 ||  || — || April 9, 2002 || Socorro || LINEAR || — || align=right | 2.9 km || 
|-id=393 bgcolor=#E9E9E9
| 132393 ||  || — || April 9, 2002 || Socorro || LINEAR || — || align=right | 2.4 km || 
|-id=394 bgcolor=#E9E9E9
| 132394 ||  || — || April 9, 2002 || Socorro || LINEAR || — || align=right | 1.8 km || 
|-id=395 bgcolor=#E9E9E9
| 132395 ||  || — || April 9, 2002 || Socorro || LINEAR || — || align=right | 1.9 km || 
|-id=396 bgcolor=#fefefe
| 132396 ||  || — || April 10, 2002 || Socorro || LINEAR || V || align=right | 1.3 km || 
|-id=397 bgcolor=#E9E9E9
| 132397 ||  || — || April 10, 2002 || Socorro || LINEAR || — || align=right | 3.9 km || 
|-id=398 bgcolor=#fefefe
| 132398 ||  || — || April 10, 2002 || Socorro || LINEAR || NYS || align=right | 1.3 km || 
|-id=399 bgcolor=#fefefe
| 132399 ||  || — || April 10, 2002 || Socorro || LINEAR || — || align=right | 1.6 km || 
|-id=400 bgcolor=#E9E9E9
| 132400 ||  || — || April 10, 2002 || Socorro || LINEAR || — || align=right | 3.1 km || 
|}

132401–132500 

|-bgcolor=#fefefe
| 132401 ||  || — || April 10, 2002 || Socorro || LINEAR || NYS || align=right | 1.3 km || 
|-id=402 bgcolor=#E9E9E9
| 132402 ||  || — || April 10, 2002 || Socorro || LINEAR || — || align=right | 1.5 km || 
|-id=403 bgcolor=#E9E9E9
| 132403 ||  || — || April 10, 2002 || Socorro || LINEAR || — || align=right | 2.2 km || 
|-id=404 bgcolor=#fefefe
| 132404 ||  || — || April 11, 2002 || Socorro || LINEAR || — || align=right | 2.3 km || 
|-id=405 bgcolor=#fefefe
| 132405 ||  || — || April 11, 2002 || Socorro || LINEAR || NYS || align=right | 1.1 km || 
|-id=406 bgcolor=#E9E9E9
| 132406 ||  || — || April 11, 2002 || Palomar || NEAT || — || align=right | 2.3 km || 
|-id=407 bgcolor=#fefefe
| 132407 ||  || — || April 10, 2002 || Socorro || LINEAR || — || align=right | 1.6 km || 
|-id=408 bgcolor=#d6d6d6
| 132408 ||  || — || April 10, 2002 || Socorro || LINEAR || — || align=right | 4.6 km || 
|-id=409 bgcolor=#fefefe
| 132409 ||  || — || April 11, 2002 || Socorro || LINEAR || — || align=right | 1.6 km || 
|-id=410 bgcolor=#E9E9E9
| 132410 ||  || — || April 11, 2002 || Socorro || LINEAR || — || align=right | 3.1 km || 
|-id=411 bgcolor=#fefefe
| 132411 ||  || — || April 11, 2002 || Socorro || LINEAR || — || align=right | 1.7 km || 
|-id=412 bgcolor=#E9E9E9
| 132412 ||  || — || April 12, 2002 || Kitt Peak || Spacewatch || PAD || align=right | 3.6 km || 
|-id=413 bgcolor=#fefefe
| 132413 ||  || — || April 10, 2002 || Socorro || LINEAR || NYS || align=right | 1.5 km || 
|-id=414 bgcolor=#fefefe
| 132414 ||  || — || April 12, 2002 || Socorro || LINEAR || — || align=right | 1.7 km || 
|-id=415 bgcolor=#E9E9E9
| 132415 ||  || — || April 12, 2002 || Palomar || NEAT || — || align=right | 1.6 km || 
|-id=416 bgcolor=#E9E9E9
| 132416 ||  || — || April 12, 2002 || Socorro || LINEAR || — || align=right | 3.6 km || 
|-id=417 bgcolor=#fefefe
| 132417 ||  || — || April 12, 2002 || Socorro || LINEAR || NYS || align=right | 2.4 km || 
|-id=418 bgcolor=#E9E9E9
| 132418 ||  || — || April 12, 2002 || Socorro || LINEAR || WIT || align=right | 1.7 km || 
|-id=419 bgcolor=#E9E9E9
| 132419 ||  || — || April 12, 2002 || Socorro || LINEAR || — || align=right | 1.6 km || 
|-id=420 bgcolor=#E9E9E9
| 132420 ||  || — || April 12, 2002 || Socorro || LINEAR || — || align=right | 1.3 km || 
|-id=421 bgcolor=#fefefe
| 132421 ||  || — || April 13, 2002 || Kitt Peak || Spacewatch || MAS || align=right | 1.3 km || 
|-id=422 bgcolor=#E9E9E9
| 132422 ||  || — || April 11, 2002 || Palomar || NEAT || — || align=right | 4.7 km || 
|-id=423 bgcolor=#fefefe
| 132423 ||  || — || April 13, 2002 || Palomar || NEAT || FLO || align=right | 1.3 km || 
|-id=424 bgcolor=#E9E9E9
| 132424 ||  || — || April 13, 2002 || Palomar || NEAT || JUN || align=right | 2.0 km || 
|-id=425 bgcolor=#E9E9E9
| 132425 ||  || — || April 13, 2002 || Palomar || NEAT || JUN || align=right | 2.5 km || 
|-id=426 bgcolor=#fefefe
| 132426 ||  || — || April 14, 2002 || Socorro || LINEAR || — || align=right | 1.4 km || 
|-id=427 bgcolor=#fefefe
| 132427 ||  || — || April 14, 2002 || Palomar || NEAT || — || align=right | 1.6 km || 
|-id=428 bgcolor=#E9E9E9
| 132428 ||  || — || April 14, 2002 || Palomar || NEAT || NEM || align=right | 3.7 km || 
|-id=429 bgcolor=#fefefe
| 132429 ||  || — || April 12, 2002 || Palomar || NEAT || KLI || align=right | 3.2 km || 
|-id=430 bgcolor=#fefefe
| 132430 ||  || — || April 12, 2002 || Haleakala || NEAT || NYS || align=right | 1.2 km || 
|-id=431 bgcolor=#E9E9E9
| 132431 ||  || — || April 14, 2002 || Palomar || NEAT || — || align=right | 1.9 km || 
|-id=432 bgcolor=#E9E9E9
| 132432 ||  || — || April 15, 2002 || Palomar || NEAT || EUN || align=right | 1.4 km || 
|-id=433 bgcolor=#fefefe
| 132433 ||  || — || April 14, 2002 || Palomar || NEAT || V || align=right | 1.3 km || 
|-id=434 bgcolor=#fefefe
| 132434 ||  || — || April 14, 2002 || Kitt Peak || Spacewatch || MAS || align=right | 1.3 km || 
|-id=435 bgcolor=#E9E9E9
| 132435 ||  || — || April 14, 2002 || Palomar || NEAT || — || align=right | 2.4 km || 
|-id=436 bgcolor=#fefefe
| 132436 ||  || — || April 14, 2002 || Palomar || NEAT || FLO || align=right | 1.6 km || 
|-id=437 bgcolor=#E9E9E9
| 132437 ||  || — || April 14, 2002 || Palomar || NEAT || — || align=right | 1.9 km || 
|-id=438 bgcolor=#E9E9E9
| 132438 ||  || — || April 9, 2002 || Socorro || LINEAR || — || align=right | 1.5 km || 
|-id=439 bgcolor=#E9E9E9
| 132439 ||  || — || April 9, 2002 || Socorro || LINEAR || WIT || align=right | 1.9 km || 
|-id=440 bgcolor=#E9E9E9
| 132440 ||  || — || April 10, 2002 || Socorro || LINEAR || — || align=right | 1.7 km || 
|-id=441 bgcolor=#fefefe
| 132441 ||  || — || April 11, 2002 || Socorro || LINEAR || V || align=right | 1.2 km || 
|-id=442 bgcolor=#fefefe
| 132442 ||  || — || April 8, 2002 || Palomar || NEAT || V || align=right | 1.4 km || 
|-id=443 bgcolor=#E9E9E9
| 132443 ||  || — || April 5, 2002 || Palomar || M. White, M. Collins || — || align=right | 5.3 km || 
|-id=444 bgcolor=#fefefe
| 132444 ||  || — || April 14, 2002 || Haleakala || M. White, M. Collins || — || align=right | 1.4 km || 
|-id=445 bgcolor=#fefefe
| 132445 Gaertner ||  ||  || April 14, 2002 || Palomar || M. Meyer || — || align=right | 1.4 km || 
|-id=446 bgcolor=#fefefe
| 132446 ||  || — || April 16, 2002 || Socorro || LINEAR || — || align=right | 3.0 km || 
|-id=447 bgcolor=#E9E9E9
| 132447 ||  || — || April 16, 2002 || Socorro || LINEAR || MAR || align=right | 2.4 km || 
|-id=448 bgcolor=#fefefe
| 132448 ||  || — || April 16, 2002 || Socorro || LINEAR || — || align=right | 1.9 km || 
|-id=449 bgcolor=#fefefe
| 132449 ||  || — || April 16, 2002 || Socorro || LINEAR || — || align=right | 1.8 km || 
|-id=450 bgcolor=#fefefe
| 132450 ||  || — || April 16, 2002 || Socorro || LINEAR || — || align=right | 1.4 km || 
|-id=451 bgcolor=#fefefe
| 132451 ||  || — || April 16, 2002 || Socorro || LINEAR || — || align=right | 1.9 km || 
|-id=452 bgcolor=#fefefe
| 132452 ||  || — || April 16, 2002 || Socorro || LINEAR || V || align=right | 1.2 km || 
|-id=453 bgcolor=#fefefe
| 132453 ||  || — || April 16, 2002 || Socorro || LINEAR || — || align=right | 1.6 km || 
|-id=454 bgcolor=#fefefe
| 132454 ||  || — || April 16, 2002 || Socorro || LINEAR || — || align=right | 1.9 km || 
|-id=455 bgcolor=#E9E9E9
| 132455 ||  || — || April 17, 2002 || Socorro || LINEAR || — || align=right | 3.8 km || 
|-id=456 bgcolor=#E9E9E9
| 132456 ||  || — || April 17, 2002 || Socorro || LINEAR || MAR || align=right | 1.9 km || 
|-id=457 bgcolor=#E9E9E9
| 132457 ||  || — || April 18, 2002 || Kitt Peak || Spacewatch || — || align=right | 3.2 km || 
|-id=458 bgcolor=#fefefe
| 132458 ||  || — || April 18, 2002 || Haleakala || NEAT || — || align=right | 1.8 km || 
|-id=459 bgcolor=#E9E9E9
| 132459 ||  || — || April 18, 2002 || Palomar || NEAT || — || align=right | 2.5 km || 
|-id=460 bgcolor=#E9E9E9
| 132460 ||  || — || April 18, 2002 || Desert Eagle || W. K. Y. Yeung || — || align=right | 1.8 km || 
|-id=461 bgcolor=#E9E9E9
| 132461 ||  || — || April 30, 2002 || Palomar || NEAT || — || align=right | 3.0 km || 
|-id=462 bgcolor=#fefefe
| 132462 ||  || — || April 22, 2002 || Socorro || LINEAR || PHO || align=right | 2.1 km || 
|-id=463 bgcolor=#E9E9E9
| 132463 ||  || — || April 17, 2002 || Socorro || LINEAR || — || align=right | 2.1 km || 
|-id=464 bgcolor=#E9E9E9
| 132464 || 2002 JM || — || May 3, 2002 || Desert Eagle || W. K. Y. Yeung || EUN || align=right | 2.1 km || 
|-id=465 bgcolor=#E9E9E9
| 132465 || 2002 JO || — || May 3, 2002 || Desert Eagle || W. K. Y. Yeung || — || align=right | 5.1 km || 
|-id=466 bgcolor=#E9E9E9
| 132466 || 2002 JY || — || May 3, 2002 || Desert Eagle || W. K. Y. Yeung || — || align=right | 1.7 km || 
|-id=467 bgcolor=#E9E9E9
| 132467 ||  || — || May 4, 2002 || Desert Eagle || W. K. Y. Yeung || — || align=right | 3.0 km || 
|-id=468 bgcolor=#fefefe
| 132468 ||  || — || May 3, 2002 || Palomar || NEAT || NYS || align=right | 1.3 km || 
|-id=469 bgcolor=#E9E9E9
| 132469 ||  || — || May 5, 2002 || Desert Eagle || W. K. Y. Yeung || EUN || align=right | 2.5 km || 
|-id=470 bgcolor=#fefefe
| 132470 ||  || — || May 6, 2002 || Palomar || NEAT || — || align=right | 1.8 km || 
|-id=471 bgcolor=#fefefe
| 132471 ||  || — || May 4, 2002 || Anderson Mesa || LONEOS || FLO || align=right | 1.6 km || 
|-id=472 bgcolor=#E9E9E9
| 132472 ||  || — || May 6, 2002 || Anderson Mesa || LONEOS || — || align=right | 2.4 km || 
|-id=473 bgcolor=#fefefe
| 132473 ||  || — || May 5, 2002 || Desert Eagle || W. K. Y. Yeung || NYS || align=right data-sort-value="0.96" | 960 m || 
|-id=474 bgcolor=#E9E9E9
| 132474 ||  || — || May 8, 2002 || Desert Eagle || W. K. Y. Yeung || — || align=right | 2.7 km || 
|-id=475 bgcolor=#fefefe
| 132475 ||  || — || May 7, 2002 || Socorro || LINEAR || — || align=right | 1.8 km || 
|-id=476 bgcolor=#E9E9E9
| 132476 ||  || — || May 8, 2002 || Socorro || LINEAR || — || align=right | 2.1 km || 
|-id=477 bgcolor=#E9E9E9
| 132477 ||  || — || May 1, 2002 || Palomar || NEAT || EUN || align=right | 2.4 km || 
|-id=478 bgcolor=#E9E9E9
| 132478 ||  || — || May 7, 2002 || Palomar || NEAT || — || align=right | 1.5 km || 
|-id=479 bgcolor=#E9E9E9
| 132479 ||  || — || May 7, 2002 || Palomar || NEAT || — || align=right | 3.3 km || 
|-id=480 bgcolor=#fefefe
| 132480 ||  || — || May 7, 2002 || Palomar || NEAT || V || align=right | 1.1 km || 
|-id=481 bgcolor=#E9E9E9
| 132481 ||  || — || May 8, 2002 || Socorro || LINEAR || INO || align=right | 2.8 km || 
|-id=482 bgcolor=#fefefe
| 132482 ||  || — || May 8, 2002 || Socorro || LINEAR || FLO || align=right | 1.3 km || 
|-id=483 bgcolor=#fefefe
| 132483 ||  || — || May 8, 2002 || Socorro || LINEAR || NYS || align=right | 1.3 km || 
|-id=484 bgcolor=#E9E9E9
| 132484 ||  || — || May 8, 2002 || Socorro || LINEAR || — || align=right | 1.7 km || 
|-id=485 bgcolor=#fefefe
| 132485 ||  || — || May 8, 2002 || Socorro || LINEAR || — || align=right | 1.8 km || 
|-id=486 bgcolor=#fefefe
| 132486 ||  || — || May 8, 2002 || Socorro || LINEAR || — || align=right | 1.5 km || 
|-id=487 bgcolor=#E9E9E9
| 132487 ||  || — || May 8, 2002 || Socorro || LINEAR || — || align=right | 2.1 km || 
|-id=488 bgcolor=#E9E9E9
| 132488 ||  || — || May 9, 2002 || Socorro || LINEAR || — || align=right | 1.6 km || 
|-id=489 bgcolor=#E9E9E9
| 132489 ||  || — || May 9, 2002 || Socorro || LINEAR || — || align=right | 1.4 km || 
|-id=490 bgcolor=#E9E9E9
| 132490 ||  || — || May 9, 2002 || Socorro || LINEAR || JUN || align=right | 2.1 km || 
|-id=491 bgcolor=#fefefe
| 132491 ||  || — || May 9, 2002 || Socorro || LINEAR || — || align=right | 3.3 km || 
|-id=492 bgcolor=#E9E9E9
| 132492 ||  || — || May 9, 2002 || Socorro || LINEAR || — || align=right | 2.2 km || 
|-id=493 bgcolor=#E9E9E9
| 132493 ||  || — || May 9, 2002 || Socorro || LINEAR || — || align=right | 1.4 km || 
|-id=494 bgcolor=#E9E9E9
| 132494 ||  || — || May 9, 2002 || Socorro || LINEAR || — || align=right | 1.5 km || 
|-id=495 bgcolor=#E9E9E9
| 132495 ||  || — || May 9, 2002 || Socorro || LINEAR || — || align=right | 1.9 km || 
|-id=496 bgcolor=#E9E9E9
| 132496 ||  || — || May 9, 2002 || Socorro || LINEAR || — || align=right | 1.9 km || 
|-id=497 bgcolor=#E9E9E9
| 132497 ||  || — || May 9, 2002 || Socorro || LINEAR || — || align=right | 1.9 km || 
|-id=498 bgcolor=#E9E9E9
| 132498 ||  || — || May 9, 2002 || Socorro || LINEAR || — || align=right | 3.8 km || 
|-id=499 bgcolor=#E9E9E9
| 132499 ||  || — || May 9, 2002 || Socorro || LINEAR || — || align=right | 3.3 km || 
|-id=500 bgcolor=#E9E9E9
| 132500 ||  || — || May 9, 2002 || Socorro || LINEAR || — || align=right | 2.2 km || 
|}

132501–132600 

|-bgcolor=#E9E9E9
| 132501 ||  || — || May 9, 2002 || Socorro || LINEAR || — || align=right | 3.2 km || 
|-id=502 bgcolor=#E9E9E9
| 132502 ||  || — || May 9, 2002 || Socorro || LINEAR || — || align=right | 1.6 km || 
|-id=503 bgcolor=#E9E9E9
| 132503 ||  || — || May 9, 2002 || Socorro || LINEAR || — || align=right | 1.8 km || 
|-id=504 bgcolor=#E9E9E9
| 132504 ||  || — || May 9, 2002 || Socorro || LINEAR || MAR || align=right | 2.3 km || 
|-id=505 bgcolor=#E9E9E9
| 132505 ||  || — || May 9, 2002 || Socorro || LINEAR || — || align=right | 2.6 km || 
|-id=506 bgcolor=#E9E9E9
| 132506 ||  || — || May 9, 2002 || Anderson Mesa || LONEOS || JUN || align=right | 2.2 km || 
|-id=507 bgcolor=#E9E9E9
| 132507 ||  || — || May 8, 2002 || Haleakala || NEAT || GEF || align=right | 2.4 km || 
|-id=508 bgcolor=#E9E9E9
| 132508 ||  || — || May 9, 2002 || Palomar || NEAT || — || align=right | 4.9 km || 
|-id=509 bgcolor=#fefefe
| 132509 ||  || — || May 8, 2002 || Socorro || LINEAR || CHL || align=right | 3.4 km || 
|-id=510 bgcolor=#fefefe
| 132510 ||  || — || May 8, 2002 || Socorro || LINEAR || — || align=right | 2.0 km || 
|-id=511 bgcolor=#E9E9E9
| 132511 ||  || — || May 8, 2002 || Socorro || LINEAR || — || align=right | 3.1 km || 
|-id=512 bgcolor=#fefefe
| 132512 ||  || — || May 9, 2002 || Socorro || LINEAR || FLO || align=right | 1.6 km || 
|-id=513 bgcolor=#E9E9E9
| 132513 ||  || — || May 9, 2002 || Socorro || LINEAR || — || align=right | 1.9 km || 
|-id=514 bgcolor=#E9E9E9
| 132514 ||  || — || May 9, 2002 || Socorro || LINEAR || INO || align=right | 2.5 km || 
|-id=515 bgcolor=#E9E9E9
| 132515 ||  || — || May 9, 2002 || Socorro || LINEAR || — || align=right | 2.3 km || 
|-id=516 bgcolor=#fefefe
| 132516 ||  || — || May 9, 2002 || Socorro || LINEAR || FLO || align=right | 1.4 km || 
|-id=517 bgcolor=#E9E9E9
| 132517 ||  || — || May 9, 2002 || Socorro || LINEAR || — || align=right | 2.6 km || 
|-id=518 bgcolor=#E9E9E9
| 132518 ||  || — || May 9, 2002 || Socorro || LINEAR || — || align=right | 3.7 km || 
|-id=519 bgcolor=#E9E9E9
| 132519 ||  || — || May 9, 2002 || Socorro || LINEAR || — || align=right | 1.9 km || 
|-id=520 bgcolor=#E9E9E9
| 132520 ||  || — || May 9, 2002 || Socorro || LINEAR || — || align=right | 3.9 km || 
|-id=521 bgcolor=#E9E9E9
| 132521 ||  || — || May 9, 2002 || Socorro || LINEAR || MAR || align=right | 2.0 km || 
|-id=522 bgcolor=#E9E9E9
| 132522 ||  || — || May 9, 2002 || Socorro || LINEAR || — || align=right | 4.7 km || 
|-id=523 bgcolor=#E9E9E9
| 132523 ||  || — || May 9, 2002 || Socorro || LINEAR || — || align=right | 1.7 km || 
|-id=524 bgcolor=#E9E9E9
| 132524 APL ||  ||  || May 9, 2002 || Socorro || LINEAR || — || align=right | 3.6 km || 
|-id=525 bgcolor=#E9E9E9
| 132525 ||  || — || May 9, 2002 || Socorro || LINEAR || — || align=right | 1.5 km || 
|-id=526 bgcolor=#E9E9E9
| 132526 ||  || — || May 9, 2002 || Socorro || LINEAR || — || align=right | 1.9 km || 
|-id=527 bgcolor=#E9E9E9
| 132527 ||  || — || May 9, 2002 || Socorro || LINEAR || — || align=right | 1.4 km || 
|-id=528 bgcolor=#E9E9E9
| 132528 ||  || — || May 8, 2002 || Socorro || LINEAR || — || align=right | 1.9 km || 
|-id=529 bgcolor=#E9E9E9
| 132529 ||  || — || May 8, 2002 || Socorro || LINEAR || — || align=right | 3.3 km || 
|-id=530 bgcolor=#E9E9E9
| 132530 ||  || — || May 8, 2002 || Socorro || LINEAR || — || align=right | 2.7 km || 
|-id=531 bgcolor=#E9E9E9
| 132531 ||  || — || May 8, 2002 || Socorro || LINEAR || EUN || align=right | 2.4 km || 
|-id=532 bgcolor=#E9E9E9
| 132532 ||  || — || May 8, 2002 || Socorro || LINEAR || INO || align=right | 2.8 km || 
|-id=533 bgcolor=#E9E9E9
| 132533 ||  || — || May 9, 2002 || Socorro || LINEAR || — || align=right | 2.1 km || 
|-id=534 bgcolor=#E9E9E9
| 132534 ||  || — || May 10, 2002 || Socorro || LINEAR || — || align=right | 1.9 km || 
|-id=535 bgcolor=#E9E9E9
| 132535 ||  || — || May 10, 2002 || Socorro || LINEAR || — || align=right | 5.1 km || 
|-id=536 bgcolor=#E9E9E9
| 132536 ||  || — || May 10, 2002 || Socorro || LINEAR || — || align=right | 1.5 km || 
|-id=537 bgcolor=#E9E9E9
| 132537 ||  || — || May 8, 2002 || Socorro || LINEAR || MAR || align=right | 2.1 km || 
|-id=538 bgcolor=#E9E9E9
| 132538 ||  || — || May 8, 2002 || Socorro || LINEAR || — || align=right | 1.5 km || 
|-id=539 bgcolor=#fefefe
| 132539 ||  || — || May 8, 2002 || Socorro || LINEAR || — || align=right | 2.7 km || 
|-id=540 bgcolor=#E9E9E9
| 132540 ||  || — || May 8, 2002 || Socorro || LINEAR || — || align=right | 3.9 km || 
|-id=541 bgcolor=#E9E9E9
| 132541 ||  || — || May 8, 2002 || Socorro || LINEAR || MAR || align=right | 2.1 km || 
|-id=542 bgcolor=#E9E9E9
| 132542 ||  || — || May 8, 2002 || Socorro || LINEAR || — || align=right | 2.3 km || 
|-id=543 bgcolor=#E9E9E9
| 132543 ||  || — || May 8, 2002 || Socorro || LINEAR || — || align=right | 2.5 km || 
|-id=544 bgcolor=#E9E9E9
| 132544 ||  || — || May 8, 2002 || Socorro || LINEAR || — || align=right | 2.2 km || 
|-id=545 bgcolor=#E9E9E9
| 132545 ||  || — || May 8, 2002 || Socorro || LINEAR || RAF || align=right | 2.2 km || 
|-id=546 bgcolor=#E9E9E9
| 132546 ||  || — || May 8, 2002 || Socorro || LINEAR || — || align=right | 4.1 km || 
|-id=547 bgcolor=#E9E9E9
| 132547 ||  || — || May 8, 2002 || Socorro || LINEAR || — || align=right | 4.7 km || 
|-id=548 bgcolor=#fefefe
| 132548 ||  || — || May 9, 2002 || Socorro || LINEAR || V || align=right | 1.1 km || 
|-id=549 bgcolor=#E9E9E9
| 132549 ||  || — || May 11, 2002 || Socorro || LINEAR || — || align=right | 1.9 km || 
|-id=550 bgcolor=#E9E9E9
| 132550 ||  || — || May 11, 2002 || Socorro || LINEAR || — || align=right | 3.0 km || 
|-id=551 bgcolor=#fefefe
| 132551 ||  || — || May 11, 2002 || Socorro || LINEAR || — || align=right | 1.8 km || 
|-id=552 bgcolor=#E9E9E9
| 132552 ||  || — || May 11, 2002 || Socorro || LINEAR || — || align=right | 1.8 km || 
|-id=553 bgcolor=#E9E9E9
| 132553 ||  || — || May 11, 2002 || Socorro || LINEAR || RAF || align=right | 2.0 km || 
|-id=554 bgcolor=#E9E9E9
| 132554 ||  || — || May 11, 2002 || Socorro || LINEAR || — || align=right | 1.6 km || 
|-id=555 bgcolor=#E9E9E9
| 132555 ||  || — || May 11, 2002 || Socorro || LINEAR || — || align=right | 1.6 km || 
|-id=556 bgcolor=#fefefe
| 132556 ||  || — || May 11, 2002 || Socorro || LINEAR || FLO || align=right | 1.3 km || 
|-id=557 bgcolor=#E9E9E9
| 132557 ||  || — || May 11, 2002 || Socorro || LINEAR || — || align=right | 2.2 km || 
|-id=558 bgcolor=#E9E9E9
| 132558 ||  || — || May 11, 2002 || Socorro || LINEAR || — || align=right | 1.3 km || 
|-id=559 bgcolor=#E9E9E9
| 132559 ||  || — || May 11, 2002 || Socorro || LINEAR || — || align=right | 3.1 km || 
|-id=560 bgcolor=#E9E9E9
| 132560 ||  || — || May 11, 2002 || Socorro || LINEAR || HNS || align=right | 1.9 km || 
|-id=561 bgcolor=#E9E9E9
| 132561 ||  || — || May 11, 2002 || Socorro || LINEAR || — || align=right | 2.9 km || 
|-id=562 bgcolor=#E9E9E9
| 132562 ||  || — || May 11, 2002 || Socorro || LINEAR || — || align=right | 3.1 km || 
|-id=563 bgcolor=#E9E9E9
| 132563 ||  || — || May 11, 2002 || Socorro || LINEAR || — || align=right | 1.7 km || 
|-id=564 bgcolor=#E9E9E9
| 132564 ||  || — || May 11, 2002 || Socorro || LINEAR || — || align=right | 1.4 km || 
|-id=565 bgcolor=#E9E9E9
| 132565 ||  || — || May 13, 2002 || Palomar || NEAT || — || align=right | 3.6 km || 
|-id=566 bgcolor=#fefefe
| 132566 ||  || — || May 8, 2002 || Socorro || LINEAR || — || align=right | 2.0 km || 
|-id=567 bgcolor=#E9E9E9
| 132567 ||  || — || May 9, 2002 || Socorro || LINEAR || — || align=right | 6.0 km || 
|-id=568 bgcolor=#E9E9E9
| 132568 ||  || — || May 9, 2002 || Socorro || LINEAR || — || align=right | 1.4 km || 
|-id=569 bgcolor=#d6d6d6
| 132569 ||  || — || May 9, 2002 || Socorro || LINEAR || — || align=right | 5.4 km || 
|-id=570 bgcolor=#E9E9E9
| 132570 ||  || — || May 10, 2002 || Socorro || LINEAR || — || align=right | 1.7 km || 
|-id=571 bgcolor=#E9E9E9
| 132571 ||  || — || May 10, 2002 || Socorro || LINEAR || — || align=right | 5.5 km || 
|-id=572 bgcolor=#fefefe
| 132572 ||  || — || May 13, 2002 || Socorro || LINEAR || V || align=right | 1.1 km || 
|-id=573 bgcolor=#E9E9E9
| 132573 ||  || — || May 6, 2002 || Socorro || LINEAR || — || align=right | 6.8 km || 
|-id=574 bgcolor=#E9E9E9
| 132574 ||  || — || May 11, 2002 || Socorro || LINEAR || — || align=right | 2.7 km || 
|-id=575 bgcolor=#E9E9E9
| 132575 ||  || — || May 11, 2002 || Socorro || LINEAR || — || align=right | 2.5 km || 
|-id=576 bgcolor=#E9E9E9
| 132576 ||  || — || May 11, 2002 || Socorro || LINEAR || — || align=right | 6.6 km || 
|-id=577 bgcolor=#E9E9E9
| 132577 ||  || — || May 13, 2002 || Socorro || LINEAR || — || align=right | 4.6 km || 
|-id=578 bgcolor=#fefefe
| 132578 ||  || — || May 15, 2002 || Haleakala || NEAT || — || align=right | 1.6 km || 
|-id=579 bgcolor=#E9E9E9
| 132579 ||  || — || May 4, 2002 || Palomar || NEAT || — || align=right | 2.0 km || 
|-id=580 bgcolor=#E9E9E9
| 132580 ||  || — || May 4, 2002 || Anderson Mesa || LONEOS || — || align=right | 2.1 km || 
|-id=581 bgcolor=#E9E9E9
| 132581 ||  || — || May 4, 2002 || Anderson Mesa || LONEOS || — || align=right | 2.3 km || 
|-id=582 bgcolor=#E9E9E9
| 132582 ||  || — || May 4, 2002 || Anderson Mesa || LONEOS || — || align=right | 2.5 km || 
|-id=583 bgcolor=#E9E9E9
| 132583 ||  || — || May 5, 2002 || Anderson Mesa || LONEOS || EUN || align=right | 1.6 km || 
|-id=584 bgcolor=#E9E9E9
| 132584 ||  || — || May 5, 2002 || Palomar || NEAT || — || align=right | 4.5 km || 
|-id=585 bgcolor=#E9E9E9
| 132585 ||  || — || May 5, 2002 || Palomar || NEAT || — || align=right | 4.8 km || 
|-id=586 bgcolor=#E9E9E9
| 132586 ||  || — || May 5, 2002 || Palomar || NEAT || EUN || align=right | 2.9 km || 
|-id=587 bgcolor=#E9E9E9
| 132587 ||  || — || May 7, 2002 || Palomar || NEAT || — || align=right | 2.8 km || 
|-id=588 bgcolor=#fefefe
| 132588 ||  || — || May 7, 2002 || Palomar || NEAT || — || align=right | 1.5 km || 
|-id=589 bgcolor=#E9E9E9
| 132589 ||  || — || May 7, 2002 || Palomar || NEAT || — || align=right | 2.3 km || 
|-id=590 bgcolor=#d6d6d6
| 132590 ||  || — || May 8, 2002 || Socorro || LINEAR || EOS || align=right | 4.0 km || 
|-id=591 bgcolor=#E9E9E9
| 132591 ||  || — || May 9, 2002 || Palomar || NEAT || — || align=right | 1.9 km || 
|-id=592 bgcolor=#E9E9E9
| 132592 ||  || — || May 9, 2002 || Palomar || NEAT || — || align=right | 2.0 km || 
|-id=593 bgcolor=#fefefe
| 132593 ||  || — || May 9, 2002 || Socorro || LINEAR || V || align=right | 1.3 km || 
|-id=594 bgcolor=#E9E9E9
| 132594 ||  || — || May 9, 2002 || Palomar || NEAT || ADE || align=right | 2.3 km || 
|-id=595 bgcolor=#E9E9E9
| 132595 ||  || — || May 9, 2002 || Palomar || NEAT || — || align=right | 1.5 km || 
|-id=596 bgcolor=#E9E9E9
| 132596 ||  || — || May 9, 2002 || Kitt Peak || Spacewatch || — || align=right | 2.5 km || 
|-id=597 bgcolor=#E9E9E9
| 132597 ||  || — || May 10, 2002 || Palomar || NEAT || — || align=right | 2.3 km || 
|-id=598 bgcolor=#E9E9E9
| 132598 ||  || — || May 11, 2002 || Socorro || LINEAR || NEM || align=right | 4.7 km || 
|-id=599 bgcolor=#E9E9E9
| 132599 ||  || — || May 13, 2002 || Socorro || LINEAR || — || align=right | 2.2 km || 
|-id=600 bgcolor=#E9E9E9
| 132600 ||  || — || May 13, 2002 || Palomar || NEAT || — || align=right | 3.6 km || 
|}

132601–132700 

|-bgcolor=#E9E9E9
| 132601 ||  || — || May 13, 2002 || Palomar || NEAT || — || align=right | 2.0 km || 
|-id=602 bgcolor=#E9E9E9
| 132602 ||  || — || May 16, 2002 || Socorro || LINEAR || — || align=right | 4.4 km || 
|-id=603 bgcolor=#E9E9E9
| 132603 ||  || — || May 25, 2002 || Palomar || NEAT || JUN || align=right | 3.0 km || 
|-id=604 bgcolor=#d6d6d6
| 132604 ||  || — || May 30, 2002 || Palomar || NEAT || — || align=right | 5.9 km || 
|-id=605 bgcolor=#E9E9E9
| 132605 ||  || — || May 29, 2002 || Haleakala || NEAT || — || align=right | 5.5 km || 
|-id=606 bgcolor=#E9E9E9
| 132606 ||  || — || May 29, 2002 || Palomar || NEAT || — || align=right | 2.3 km || 
|-id=607 bgcolor=#E9E9E9
| 132607 ||  || — || May 16, 2002 || Socorro || LINEAR || — || align=right | 1.5 km || 
|-id=608 bgcolor=#fefefe
| 132608 ||  || — || May 16, 2002 || Socorro || LINEAR || V || align=right | 1.1 km || 
|-id=609 bgcolor=#E9E9E9
| 132609 ||  || — || May 17, 2002 || Kitt Peak || Spacewatch || ADE || align=right | 4.3 km || 
|-id=610 bgcolor=#E9E9E9
| 132610 ||  || — || May 18, 2002 || Palomar || NEAT || — || align=right | 4.5 km || 
|-id=611 bgcolor=#E9E9E9
| 132611 ||  || — || May 30, 2002 || Palomar || NEAT || — || align=right | 1.9 km || 
|-id=612 bgcolor=#E9E9E9
| 132612 ||  || — || May 30, 2002 || Palomar || NEAT || — || align=right | 1.9 km || 
|-id=613 bgcolor=#E9E9E9
| 132613 ||  || — || May 30, 2002 || Palomar || NEAT || MAR || align=right | 2.3 km || 
|-id=614 bgcolor=#fefefe
| 132614 ||  || — || May 23, 2002 || Palomar || NEAT || NYS || align=right | 1.2 km || 
|-id=615 bgcolor=#E9E9E9
| 132615 ||  || — || June 2, 2002 || Palomar || NEAT || — || align=right | 2.0 km || 
|-id=616 bgcolor=#E9E9E9
| 132616 ||  || — || June 5, 2002 || Socorro || LINEAR || — || align=right | 4.7 km || 
|-id=617 bgcolor=#E9E9E9
| 132617 ||  || — || June 5, 2002 || Socorro || LINEAR || — || align=right | 3.3 km || 
|-id=618 bgcolor=#fefefe
| 132618 ||  || — || June 7, 2002 || Palomar || NEAT || — || align=right | 1.9 km || 
|-id=619 bgcolor=#E9E9E9
| 132619 ||  || — || June 1, 2002 || Palomar || NEAT || — || align=right | 3.9 km || 
|-id=620 bgcolor=#E9E9E9
| 132620 ||  || — || June 2, 2002 || Palomar || NEAT || — || align=right | 2.1 km || 
|-id=621 bgcolor=#E9E9E9
| 132621 ||  || — || June 5, 2002 || Socorro || LINEAR || — || align=right | 3.1 km || 
|-id=622 bgcolor=#E9E9E9
| 132622 ||  || — || June 5, 2002 || Socorro || LINEAR || — || align=right | 1.7 km || 
|-id=623 bgcolor=#E9E9E9
| 132623 ||  || — || June 5, 2002 || Socorro || LINEAR || — || align=right | 3.0 km || 
|-id=624 bgcolor=#d6d6d6
| 132624 ||  || — || June 5, 2002 || Socorro || LINEAR || — || align=right | 5.8 km || 
|-id=625 bgcolor=#E9E9E9
| 132625 ||  || — || June 6, 2002 || Socorro || LINEAR || — || align=right | 2.3 km || 
|-id=626 bgcolor=#d6d6d6
| 132626 ||  || — || June 6, 2002 || Socorro || LINEAR || — || align=right | 6.9 km || 
|-id=627 bgcolor=#E9E9E9
| 132627 ||  || — || June 6, 2002 || Socorro || LINEAR || EUN || align=right | 2.7 km || 
|-id=628 bgcolor=#E9E9E9
| 132628 ||  || — || June 6, 2002 || Socorro || LINEAR || PAE || align=right | 5.9 km || 
|-id=629 bgcolor=#E9E9E9
| 132629 ||  || — || June 8, 2002 || Socorro || LINEAR || AER || align=right | 2.0 km || 
|-id=630 bgcolor=#E9E9E9
| 132630 ||  || — || June 9, 2002 || Desert Eagle || W. K. Y. Yeung || EUN || align=right | 4.8 km || 
|-id=631 bgcolor=#E9E9E9
| 132631 ||  || — || June 9, 2002 || Socorro || LINEAR || — || align=right | 4.0 km || 
|-id=632 bgcolor=#fefefe
| 132632 ||  || — || June 9, 2002 || Haleakala || NEAT || KLI || align=right | 3.0 km || 
|-id=633 bgcolor=#E9E9E9
| 132633 ||  || — || June 1, 2002 || Palomar || NEAT || — || align=right | 2.3 km || 
|-id=634 bgcolor=#E9E9E9
| 132634 ||  || — || June 3, 2002 || Palomar || NEAT || — || align=right | 4.3 km || 
|-id=635 bgcolor=#E9E9E9
| 132635 ||  || — || June 10, 2002 || Socorro || LINEAR || — || align=right | 2.4 km || 
|-id=636 bgcolor=#E9E9E9
| 132636 ||  || — || June 3, 2002 || Socorro || LINEAR || — || align=right | 2.3 km || 
|-id=637 bgcolor=#E9E9E9
| 132637 ||  || — || June 9, 2002 || Socorro || LINEAR || — || align=right | 1.9 km || 
|-id=638 bgcolor=#d6d6d6
| 132638 ||  || — || June 9, 2002 || Palomar || NEAT || — || align=right | 5.7 km || 
|-id=639 bgcolor=#E9E9E9
| 132639 ||  || — || June 11, 2002 || Palomar || NEAT || — || align=right | 4.9 km || 
|-id=640 bgcolor=#E9E9E9
| 132640 ||  || — || June 9, 2002 || Socorro || LINEAR || — || align=right | 2.9 km || 
|-id=641 bgcolor=#E9E9E9
| 132641 ||  || — || June 12, 2002 || Socorro || LINEAR || — || align=right | 3.4 km || 
|-id=642 bgcolor=#E9E9E9
| 132642 ||  || — || June 5, 2002 || Palomar || NEAT || — || align=right | 3.1 km || 
|-id=643 bgcolor=#E9E9E9
| 132643 ||  || — || June 10, 2002 || Socorro || LINEAR || DOR || align=right | 5.2 km || 
|-id=644 bgcolor=#E9E9E9
| 132644 ||  || — || June 5, 2002 || Palomar || NEAT || — || align=right | 2.2 km || 
|-id=645 bgcolor=#E9E9E9
| 132645 ||  || — || June 5, 2002 || Palomar || NEAT || — || align=right | 2.2 km || 
|-id=646 bgcolor=#E9E9E9
| 132646 ||  || — || June 6, 2002 || Haleakala || NEAT || — || align=right | 4.5 km || 
|-id=647 bgcolor=#E9E9E9
| 132647 ||  || — || June 13, 2002 || Palomar || NEAT || — || align=right | 3.3 km || 
|-id=648 bgcolor=#E9E9E9
| 132648 ||  || — || June 9, 2002 || Socorro || LINEAR || — || align=right | 3.7 km || 
|-id=649 bgcolor=#E9E9E9
| 132649 ||  || — || June 9, 2002 || Socorro || LINEAR || AER || align=right | 2.8 km || 
|-id=650 bgcolor=#E9E9E9
| 132650 ||  || — || June 9, 2002 || Socorro || LINEAR || — || align=right | 3.6 km || 
|-id=651 bgcolor=#E9E9E9
| 132651 ||  || — || June 9, 2002 || Socorro || LINEAR || — || align=right | 3.2 km || 
|-id=652 bgcolor=#d6d6d6
| 132652 ||  || — || June 10, 2002 || Socorro || LINEAR || — || align=right | 5.0 km || 
|-id=653 bgcolor=#E9E9E9
| 132653 ||  || — || June 10, 2002 || Socorro || LINEAR || HNS || align=right | 2.6 km || 
|-id=654 bgcolor=#E9E9E9
| 132654 ||  || — || June 10, 2002 || Socorro || LINEAR || — || align=right | 3.7 km || 
|-id=655 bgcolor=#d6d6d6
| 132655 ||  || — || June 10, 2002 || Socorro || LINEAR || — || align=right | 7.5 km || 
|-id=656 bgcolor=#d6d6d6
| 132656 ||  || — || June 8, 2002 || Palomar || NEAT || — || align=right | 6.2 km || 
|-id=657 bgcolor=#E9E9E9
| 132657 ||  || — || June 10, 2002 || Socorro || LINEAR || — || align=right | 5.9 km || 
|-id=658 bgcolor=#E9E9E9
| 132658 ||  || — || June 14, 2002 || Socorro || LINEAR || — || align=right | 3.7 km || 
|-id=659 bgcolor=#E9E9E9
| 132659 ||  || — || June 11, 2002 || Socorro || LINEAR || — || align=right | 2.1 km || 
|-id=660 bgcolor=#E9E9E9
| 132660 ||  || — || June 12, 2002 || Socorro || LINEAR || EUN || align=right | 2.2 km || 
|-id=661 bgcolor=#E9E9E9
| 132661 Carlbaeker ||  ||  || June 12, 2002 || Palomar || M. Meyer || — || align=right | 1.6 km || 
|-id=662 bgcolor=#d6d6d6
| 132662 ||  || — || June 8, 2002 || Palomar || S. F. Hönig || THM || align=right | 5.5 km || 
|-id=663 bgcolor=#d6d6d6
| 132663 ||  || — || June 16, 2002 || Palomar || NEAT || HYG || align=right | 5.3 km || 
|-id=664 bgcolor=#E9E9E9
| 132664 ||  || — || June 25, 2002 || Palomar || NEAT || — || align=right | 3.6 km || 
|-id=665 bgcolor=#E9E9E9
| 132665 ||  || — || June 16, 2002 || Palomar || NEAT || ADE || align=right | 2.9 km || 
|-id=666 bgcolor=#E9E9E9
| 132666 ||  || — || July 3, 2002 || Palomar || NEAT || — || align=right | 1.3 km || 
|-id=667 bgcolor=#fefefe
| 132667 ||  || — || July 3, 2002 || Palomar || NEAT || LCI || align=right | 2.6 km || 
|-id=668 bgcolor=#d6d6d6
| 132668 ||  || — || July 10, 2002 || Campo Imperatore || CINEOS || KOR || align=right | 1.9 km || 
|-id=669 bgcolor=#E9E9E9
| 132669 ||  || — || July 11, 2002 || Campo Imperatore || CINEOS || — || align=right | 4.3 km || 
|-id=670 bgcolor=#E9E9E9
| 132670 ||  || — || July 1, 2002 || Palomar || NEAT || — || align=right | 2.3 km || 
|-id=671 bgcolor=#fefefe
| 132671 ||  || — || July 3, 2002 || Palomar || NEAT || — || align=right | 1.7 km || 
|-id=672 bgcolor=#E9E9E9
| 132672 ||  || — || July 3, 2002 || Palomar || NEAT || MRX || align=right | 2.2 km || 
|-id=673 bgcolor=#E9E9E9
| 132673 ||  || — || July 4, 2002 || Palomar || NEAT || GEF || align=right | 2.3 km || 
|-id=674 bgcolor=#E9E9E9
| 132674 ||  || — || July 4, 2002 || Palomar || NEAT || — || align=right | 5.4 km || 
|-id=675 bgcolor=#E9E9E9
| 132675 ||  || — || July 4, 2002 || Palomar || NEAT || — || align=right | 3.6 km || 
|-id=676 bgcolor=#E9E9E9
| 132676 ||  || — || July 5, 2002 || Socorro || LINEAR || MIS || align=right | 3.7 km || 
|-id=677 bgcolor=#E9E9E9
| 132677 ||  || — || July 5, 2002 || Socorro || LINEAR || — || align=right | 4.1 km || 
|-id=678 bgcolor=#E9E9E9
| 132678 ||  || — || July 5, 2002 || Socorro || LINEAR || — || align=right | 4.2 km || 
|-id=679 bgcolor=#E9E9E9
| 132679 ||  || — || July 6, 2002 || Desert Eagle || W. K. Y. Yeung || — || align=right | 4.0 km || 
|-id=680 bgcolor=#d6d6d6
| 132680 ||  || — || July 9, 2002 || Socorro || LINEAR || — || align=right | 5.3 km || 
|-id=681 bgcolor=#E9E9E9
| 132681 ||  || — || July 9, 2002 || Socorro || LINEAR || INO || align=right | 2.7 km || 
|-id=682 bgcolor=#E9E9E9
| 132682 ||  || — || July 9, 2002 || Socorro || LINEAR || — || align=right | 5.1 km || 
|-id=683 bgcolor=#E9E9E9
| 132683 ||  || — || July 9, 2002 || Socorro || LINEAR || — || align=right | 1.6 km || 
|-id=684 bgcolor=#E9E9E9
| 132684 ||  || — || July 9, 2002 || Socorro || LINEAR || — || align=right | 1.8 km || 
|-id=685 bgcolor=#d6d6d6
| 132685 ||  || — || July 9, 2002 || Socorro || LINEAR || EOS || align=right | 4.5 km || 
|-id=686 bgcolor=#E9E9E9
| 132686 ||  || — || July 9, 2002 || Socorro || LINEAR || PAE || align=right | 4.1 km || 
|-id=687 bgcolor=#E9E9E9
| 132687 ||  || — || July 9, 2002 || Socorro || LINEAR || — || align=right | 4.9 km || 
|-id=688 bgcolor=#d6d6d6
| 132688 ||  || — || July 9, 2002 || Socorro || LINEAR || — || align=right | 5.6 km || 
|-id=689 bgcolor=#E9E9E9
| 132689 ||  || — || July 13, 2002 || Socorro || LINEAR || — || align=right | 5.2 km || 
|-id=690 bgcolor=#E9E9E9
| 132690 ||  || — || July 12, 2002 || Palomar || NEAT || — || align=right | 1.8 km || 
|-id=691 bgcolor=#E9E9E9
| 132691 ||  || — || July 13, 2002 || Socorro || LINEAR || — || align=right | 2.4 km || 
|-id=692 bgcolor=#E9E9E9
| 132692 ||  || — || July 13, 2002 || Socorro || LINEAR || EUN || align=right | 2.6 km || 
|-id=693 bgcolor=#E9E9E9
| 132693 ||  || — || July 14, 2002 || Socorro || LINEAR || — || align=right | 2.4 km || 
|-id=694 bgcolor=#d6d6d6
| 132694 ||  || — || July 11, 2002 || Bergisch Gladbach || W. Bickel || — || align=right | 6.5 km || 
|-id=695 bgcolor=#E9E9E9
| 132695 ||  || — || July 9, 2002 || Socorro || LINEAR || — || align=right | 3.8 km || 
|-id=696 bgcolor=#d6d6d6
| 132696 ||  || — || July 9, 2002 || Socorro || LINEAR || — || align=right | 4.2 km || 
|-id=697 bgcolor=#E9E9E9
| 132697 ||  || — || July 9, 2002 || Socorro || LINEAR || — || align=right | 3.6 km || 
|-id=698 bgcolor=#d6d6d6
| 132698 ||  || — || July 9, 2002 || Socorro || LINEAR || — || align=right | 6.5 km || 
|-id=699 bgcolor=#E9E9E9
| 132699 ||  || — || July 12, 2002 || Palomar || NEAT || HOF || align=right | 5.0 km || 
|-id=700 bgcolor=#d6d6d6
| 132700 ||  || — || July 14, 2002 || Socorro || LINEAR || EOS || align=right | 3.4 km || 
|}

132701–132800 

|-bgcolor=#E9E9E9
| 132701 ||  || — || July 14, 2002 || Socorro || LINEAR || — || align=right | 3.6 km || 
|-id=702 bgcolor=#E9E9E9
| 132702 ||  || — || July 17, 2002 || Socorro || LINEAR || — || align=right | 3.5 km || 
|-id=703 bgcolor=#E9E9E9
| 132703 ||  || — || July 17, 2002 || Socorro || LINEAR || — || align=right | 3.4 km || 
|-id=704 bgcolor=#d6d6d6
| 132704 ||  || — || July 17, 2002 || Socorro || LINEAR || — || align=right | 9.2 km || 
|-id=705 bgcolor=#d6d6d6
| 132705 ||  || — || July 20, 2002 || Palomar || NEAT || — || align=right | 5.6 km || 
|-id=706 bgcolor=#E9E9E9
| 132706 ||  || — || July 22, 2002 || Palomar || NEAT || — || align=right | 2.5 km || 
|-id=707 bgcolor=#E9E9E9
| 132707 ||  || — || July 18, 2002 || Socorro || LINEAR || POS || align=right | 5.5 km || 
|-id=708 bgcolor=#d6d6d6
| 132708 ||  || — || July 18, 2002 || Socorro || LINEAR || — || align=right | 6.1 km || 
|-id=709 bgcolor=#d6d6d6
| 132709 ||  || — || July 18, 2002 || Socorro || LINEAR || — || align=right | 4.6 km || 
|-id=710 bgcolor=#E9E9E9
| 132710 ||  || — || July 18, 2002 || Socorro || LINEAR || — || align=right | 5.9 km || 
|-id=711 bgcolor=#E9E9E9
| 132711 ||  || — || July 18, 2002 || Socorro || LINEAR || — || align=right | 6.2 km || 
|-id=712 bgcolor=#d6d6d6
| 132712 ||  || — || July 18, 2002 || Socorro || LINEAR || — || align=right | 5.2 km || 
|-id=713 bgcolor=#d6d6d6
| 132713 ||  || — || July 18, 2002 || Socorro || LINEAR || — || align=right | 4.1 km || 
|-id=714 bgcolor=#d6d6d6
| 132714 ||  || — || July 18, 2002 || Socorro || LINEAR || ALA || align=right | 7.6 km || 
|-id=715 bgcolor=#d6d6d6
| 132715 ||  || — || July 18, 2002 || Socorro || LINEAR || EOS || align=right | 5.2 km || 
|-id=716 bgcolor=#d6d6d6
| 132716 ||  || — || July 18, 2002 || Socorro || LINEAR || — || align=right | 5.3 km || 
|-id=717 bgcolor=#d6d6d6
| 132717 ||  || — || July 22, 2002 || Palomar || S. F. Hönig || — || align=right | 5.0 km || 
|-id=718 bgcolor=#d6d6d6
| 132718 Kemény ||  ||  || July 23, 2002 || Palomar || K. Sárneczky || KOR || align=right | 2.4 km || 
|-id=719 bgcolor=#E9E9E9
| 132719 Lambey || 2002 PF ||  || August 1, 2002 || Pises || Pises Obs. || — || align=right | 1.8 km || 
|-id=720 bgcolor=#FA8072
| 132720 ||  || — || August 4, 2002 || Socorro || LINEAR || — || align=right | 2.8 km || 
|-id=721 bgcolor=#E9E9E9
| 132721 ||  || — || August 3, 2002 || Palomar || NEAT || — || align=right | 2.4 km || 
|-id=722 bgcolor=#d6d6d6
| 132722 ||  || — || August 3, 2002 || Palomar || NEAT || — || align=right | 4.9 km || 
|-id=723 bgcolor=#d6d6d6
| 132723 ||  || — || August 4, 2002 || Palomar || NEAT || — || align=right | 4.3 km || 
|-id=724 bgcolor=#d6d6d6
| 132724 ||  || — || August 4, 2002 || Palomar || NEAT || — || align=right | 3.8 km || 
|-id=725 bgcolor=#d6d6d6
| 132725 ||  || — || August 5, 2002 || Palomar || NEAT || — || align=right | 7.3 km || 
|-id=726 bgcolor=#E9E9E9
| 132726 ||  || — || August 6, 2002 || Palomar || NEAT || — || align=right | 2.1 km || 
|-id=727 bgcolor=#d6d6d6
| 132727 ||  || — || August 6, 2002 || Palomar || NEAT || — || align=right | 5.5 km || 
|-id=728 bgcolor=#E9E9E9
| 132728 ||  || — || August 6, 2002 || Palomar || NEAT || — || align=right | 3.3 km || 
|-id=729 bgcolor=#d6d6d6
| 132729 ||  || — || August 6, 2002 || Palomar || NEAT || — || align=right | 4.7 km || 
|-id=730 bgcolor=#d6d6d6
| 132730 ||  || — || August 6, 2002 || Palomar || NEAT || — || align=right | 3.7 km || 
|-id=731 bgcolor=#d6d6d6
| 132731 ||  || — || August 6, 2002 || Palomar || NEAT || — || align=right | 4.4 km || 
|-id=732 bgcolor=#d6d6d6
| 132732 ||  || — || August 6, 2002 || Palomar || NEAT || — || align=right | 4.3 km || 
|-id=733 bgcolor=#d6d6d6
| 132733 ||  || — || August 6, 2002 || Palomar || NEAT || — || align=right | 5.1 km || 
|-id=734 bgcolor=#d6d6d6
| 132734 ||  || — || August 6, 2002 || Palomar || NEAT || — || align=right | 4.9 km || 
|-id=735 bgcolor=#d6d6d6
| 132735 ||  || — || August 6, 2002 || Palomar || NEAT || KOR || align=right | 2.0 km || 
|-id=736 bgcolor=#d6d6d6
| 132736 ||  || — || August 6, 2002 || Palomar || NEAT || VER || align=right | 6.1 km || 
|-id=737 bgcolor=#d6d6d6
| 132737 ||  || — || August 6, 2002 || Palomar || NEAT || HYG || align=right | 4.9 km || 
|-id=738 bgcolor=#E9E9E9
| 132738 ||  || — || August 6, 2002 || Palomar || NEAT || MRX || align=right | 1.7 km || 
|-id=739 bgcolor=#d6d6d6
| 132739 ||  || — || August 6, 2002 || Palomar || NEAT || — || align=right | 6.1 km || 
|-id=740 bgcolor=#d6d6d6
| 132740 ||  || — || August 6, 2002 || Palomar || NEAT || — || align=right | 4.4 km || 
|-id=741 bgcolor=#d6d6d6
| 132741 ||  || — || August 6, 2002 || Campo Imperatore || CINEOS || — || align=right | 5.3 km || 
|-id=742 bgcolor=#E9E9E9
| 132742 ||  || — || August 7, 2002 || Palomar || NEAT || — || align=right | 1.9 km || 
|-id=743 bgcolor=#E9E9E9
| 132743 ||  || — || August 5, 2002 || Socorro || LINEAR || — || align=right | 2.2 km || 
|-id=744 bgcolor=#E9E9E9
| 132744 ||  || — || August 4, 2002 || Socorro || LINEAR || — || align=right | 3.2 km || 
|-id=745 bgcolor=#E9E9E9
| 132745 ||  || — || August 4, 2002 || Socorro || LINEAR || — || align=right | 3.2 km || 
|-id=746 bgcolor=#E9E9E9
| 132746 ||  || — || August 5, 2002 || Socorro || LINEAR || — || align=right | 4.0 km || 
|-id=747 bgcolor=#E9E9E9
| 132747 ||  || — || August 11, 2002 || Needville || Needville Obs. || — || align=right | 1.4 km || 
|-id=748 bgcolor=#d6d6d6
| 132748 ||  || — || August 5, 2002 || Socorro || LINEAR || 7:4 || align=right | 4.5 km || 
|-id=749 bgcolor=#E9E9E9
| 132749 ||  || — || August 10, 2002 || Socorro || LINEAR || — || align=right | 5.5 km || 
|-id=750 bgcolor=#d6d6d6
| 132750 ||  || — || August 10, 2002 || Socorro || LINEAR || VER || align=right | 8.2 km || 
|-id=751 bgcolor=#d6d6d6
| 132751 ||  || — || August 10, 2002 || Socorro || LINEAR || EOS || align=right | 4.2 km || 
|-id=752 bgcolor=#d6d6d6
| 132752 ||  || — || August 10, 2002 || Socorro || LINEAR || VER || align=right | 5.8 km || 
|-id=753 bgcolor=#d6d6d6
| 132753 ||  || — || August 8, 2002 || Palomar || NEAT || — || align=right | 4.8 km || 
|-id=754 bgcolor=#d6d6d6
| 132754 ||  || — || August 5, 2002 || Socorro || LINEAR || — || align=right | 8.4 km || 
|-id=755 bgcolor=#d6d6d6
| 132755 ||  || — || August 10, 2002 || Socorro || LINEAR || HYG || align=right | 5.1 km || 
|-id=756 bgcolor=#E9E9E9
| 132756 ||  || — || August 8, 2002 || Palomar || NEAT || — || align=right | 4.0 km || 
|-id=757 bgcolor=#d6d6d6
| 132757 ||  || — || August 5, 2002 || Palomar || NEAT || — || align=right | 3.4 km || 
|-id=758 bgcolor=#d6d6d6
| 132758 ||  || — || August 11, 2002 || Socorro || LINEAR || — || align=right | 5.6 km || 
|-id=759 bgcolor=#d6d6d6
| 132759 ||  || — || August 11, 2002 || Socorro || LINEAR || — || align=right | 5.3 km || 
|-id=760 bgcolor=#E9E9E9
| 132760 ||  || — || August 11, 2002 || Socorro || LINEAR || JUN || align=right | 2.8 km || 
|-id=761 bgcolor=#E9E9E9
| 132761 ||  || — || August 12, 2002 || Socorro || LINEAR || — || align=right | 5.3 km || 
|-id=762 bgcolor=#d6d6d6
| 132762 ||  || — || August 12, 2002 || Socorro || LINEAR || — || align=right | 7.1 km || 
|-id=763 bgcolor=#d6d6d6
| 132763 ||  || — || August 12, 2002 || Socorro || LINEAR || — || align=right | 7.4 km || 
|-id=764 bgcolor=#d6d6d6
| 132764 ||  || — || August 9, 2002 || Haleakala || NEAT || URS || align=right | 7.0 km || 
|-id=765 bgcolor=#E9E9E9
| 132765 ||  || — || August 13, 2002 || Palomar || NEAT || — || align=right | 4.2 km || 
|-id=766 bgcolor=#E9E9E9
| 132766 ||  || — || August 10, 2002 || Socorro || LINEAR || — || align=right | 3.7 km || 
|-id=767 bgcolor=#E9E9E9
| 132767 ||  || — || August 10, 2002 || Socorro || LINEAR || — || align=right | 3.3 km || 
|-id=768 bgcolor=#d6d6d6
| 132768 ||  || — || August 12, 2002 || Anderson Mesa || LONEOS || — || align=right | 4.3 km || 
|-id=769 bgcolor=#E9E9E9
| 132769 ||  || — || August 13, 2002 || Socorro || LINEAR || — || align=right | 3.8 km || 
|-id=770 bgcolor=#d6d6d6
| 132770 ||  || — || August 14, 2002 || Palomar || NEAT || URS || align=right | 10 km || 
|-id=771 bgcolor=#E9E9E9
| 132771 ||  || — || August 13, 2002 || Palomar || NEAT || — || align=right | 4.3 km || 
|-id=772 bgcolor=#E9E9E9
| 132772 ||  || — || August 14, 2002 || Socorro || LINEAR || — || align=right | 1.9 km || 
|-id=773 bgcolor=#E9E9E9
| 132773 ||  || — || August 14, 2002 || Socorro || LINEAR || AGN || align=right | 2.5 km || 
|-id=774 bgcolor=#d6d6d6
| 132774 ||  || — || August 14, 2002 || Socorro || LINEAR || — || align=right | 6.1 km || 
|-id=775 bgcolor=#d6d6d6
| 132775 ||  || — || August 14, 2002 || Socorro || LINEAR || — || align=right | 5.4 km || 
|-id=776 bgcolor=#d6d6d6
| 132776 ||  || — || August 12, 2002 || Socorro || LINEAR || EOS || align=right | 4.0 km || 
|-id=777 bgcolor=#d6d6d6
| 132777 ||  || — || August 13, 2002 || Palomar || NEAT || EOS || align=right | 6.2 km || 
|-id=778 bgcolor=#d6d6d6
| 132778 ||  || — || August 13, 2002 || Socorro || LINEAR || — || align=right | 3.9 km || 
|-id=779 bgcolor=#d6d6d6
| 132779 ||  || — || August 13, 2002 || Socorro || LINEAR || — || align=right | 3.8 km || 
|-id=780 bgcolor=#d6d6d6
| 132780 ||  || — || August 13, 2002 || Anderson Mesa || LONEOS || — || align=right | 7.4 km || 
|-id=781 bgcolor=#E9E9E9
| 132781 ||  || — || August 13, 2002 || Anderson Mesa || LONEOS || INO || align=right | 2.6 km || 
|-id=782 bgcolor=#d6d6d6
| 132782 ||  || — || August 14, 2002 || Anderson Mesa || LONEOS || — || align=right | 5.1 km || 
|-id=783 bgcolor=#E9E9E9
| 132783 ||  || — || August 13, 2002 || Anderson Mesa || LONEOS || — || align=right | 1.5 km || 
|-id=784 bgcolor=#E9E9E9
| 132784 ||  || — || August 14, 2002 || Socorro || LINEAR || — || align=right | 1.6 km || 
|-id=785 bgcolor=#d6d6d6
| 132785 ||  || — || August 14, 2002 || Socorro || LINEAR || ALA || align=right | 9.0 km || 
|-id=786 bgcolor=#d6d6d6
| 132786 ||  || — || August 13, 2002 || Socorro || LINEAR || — || align=right | 4.6 km || 
|-id=787 bgcolor=#d6d6d6
| 132787 ||  || — || August 14, 2002 || Socorro || LINEAR || HYG || align=right | 6.0 km || 
|-id=788 bgcolor=#d6d6d6
| 132788 ||  || — || August 14, 2002 || Socorro || LINEAR || — || align=right | 7.7 km || 
|-id=789 bgcolor=#d6d6d6
| 132789 ||  || — || August 14, 2002 || Socorro || LINEAR || — || align=right | 4.0 km || 
|-id=790 bgcolor=#E9E9E9
| 132790 ||  || — || August 14, 2002 || Siding Spring || R. H. McNaught || JUN || align=right | 2.9 km || 
|-id=791 bgcolor=#d6d6d6
| 132791 ||  || — || August 11, 2002 || Cerro Tololo || M. W. Buie || — || align=right | 5.6 km || 
|-id=792 bgcolor=#d6d6d6
| 132792 Scottsmith ||  ||  || August 10, 2002 || Cerro Tololo || R. Millis || — || align=right | 3.9 km || 
|-id=793 bgcolor=#E9E9E9
| 132793 ||  || — || August 8, 2002 || Palomar || S. F. Hönig || — || align=right | 3.8 km || 
|-id=794 bgcolor=#d6d6d6
| 132794 ||  || — || August 8, 2002 || Palomar || S. F. Hönig || — || align=right | 5.3 km || 
|-id=795 bgcolor=#d6d6d6
| 132795 ||  || — || August 8, 2002 || Palomar || S. F. Hönig || — || align=right | 3.5 km || 
|-id=796 bgcolor=#d6d6d6
| 132796 ||  || — || August 8, 2002 || Palomar || S. F. Hönig || — || align=right | 4.4 km || 
|-id=797 bgcolor=#d6d6d6
| 132797 ||  || — || August 15, 2002 || Palomar || NEAT || — || align=right | 4.2 km || 
|-id=798 bgcolor=#E9E9E9
| 132798 Kürti ||  ||  || August 8, 2002 || Palomar || NEAT || — || align=right | 1.4 km || 
|-id=799 bgcolor=#d6d6d6
| 132799 ||  || — || August 11, 2002 || Palomar || NEAT || KOR || align=right | 2.0 km || 
|-id=800 bgcolor=#E9E9E9
| 132800 || 2002 QM || — || August 16, 2002 || Anderson Mesa || LONEOS || — || align=right | 9.7 km || 
|}

132801–132900 

|-bgcolor=#d6d6d6
| 132801 ||  || — || August 16, 2002 || Haleakala || NEAT || — || align=right | 5.3 km || 
|-id=802 bgcolor=#d6d6d6
| 132802 ||  || — || August 16, 2002 || Haleakala || NEAT || — || align=right | 4.9 km || 
|-id=803 bgcolor=#d6d6d6
| 132803 ||  || — || August 16, 2002 || Palomar || NEAT || — || align=right | 5.1 km || 
|-id=804 bgcolor=#d6d6d6
| 132804 ||  || — || August 19, 2002 || Palomar || NEAT || EOS || align=right | 4.6 km || 
|-id=805 bgcolor=#E9E9E9
| 132805 ||  || — || August 19, 2002 || Palomar || NEAT || — || align=right | 5.3 km || 
|-id=806 bgcolor=#d6d6d6
| 132806 ||  || — || August 19, 2002 || Palomar || NEAT || — || align=right | 4.8 km || 
|-id=807 bgcolor=#E9E9E9
| 132807 ||  || — || August 29, 2002 || Palomar || NEAT || — || align=right | 2.1 km || 
|-id=808 bgcolor=#d6d6d6
| 132808 ||  || — || August 29, 2002 || Palomar || NEAT || THM || align=right | 3.9 km || 
|-id=809 bgcolor=#d6d6d6
| 132809 ||  || — || August 29, 2002 || Palomar || NEAT || KOR || align=right | 3.0 km || 
|-id=810 bgcolor=#d6d6d6
| 132810 ||  || — || August 29, 2002 || Palomar || NEAT || — || align=right | 4.6 km || 
|-id=811 bgcolor=#d6d6d6
| 132811 ||  || — || August 29, 2002 || Palomar || NEAT || — || align=right | 3.9 km || 
|-id=812 bgcolor=#d6d6d6
| 132812 ||  || — || August 29, 2002 || Palomar || NEAT || — || align=right | 4.6 km || 
|-id=813 bgcolor=#E9E9E9
| 132813 ||  || — || August 29, 2002 || Palomar || NEAT || DOR || align=right | 4.2 km || 
|-id=814 bgcolor=#E9E9E9
| 132814 ||  || — || August 30, 2002 || Palomar || NEAT || — || align=right | 4.3 km || 
|-id=815 bgcolor=#E9E9E9
| 132815 ||  || — || August 30, 2002 || Socorro || LINEAR || — || align=right | 2.4 km || 
|-id=816 bgcolor=#E9E9E9
| 132816 ||  || — || August 29, 2002 || Palomar || S. F. Hönig || — || align=right | 3.6 km || 
|-id=817 bgcolor=#d6d6d6
| 132817 ||  || — || August 28, 2002 || Palomar || R. Matson || — || align=right | 5.9 km || 
|-id=818 bgcolor=#d6d6d6
| 132818 ||  || — || August 26, 2002 || Palomar || NEAT || — || align=right | 4.7 km || 
|-id=819 bgcolor=#d6d6d6
| 132819 ||  || — || August 18, 2002 || Palomar || NEAT || THM || align=right | 2.6 km || 
|-id=820 bgcolor=#d6d6d6
| 132820 Miskotte ||  ||  || August 17, 2002 || Palomar || NEAT || — || align=right | 4.3 km || 
|-id=821 bgcolor=#d6d6d6
| 132821 ||  || — || August 18, 2002 || Palomar || NEAT || — || align=right | 5.0 km || 
|-id=822 bgcolor=#d6d6d6
| 132822 ||  || — || August 18, 2002 || Palomar || NEAT || KOR || align=right | 2.2 km || 
|-id=823 bgcolor=#E9E9E9
| 132823 ||  || — || August 30, 2002 || Palomar || NEAT || — || align=right | 2.5 km || 
|-id=824 bgcolor=#d6d6d6
| 132824 Galamb ||  ||  || August 17, 2002 || Palomar || K. Sárneczky || KOR || align=right | 1.8 km || 
|-id=825 bgcolor=#d6d6d6
| 132825 Shizu-Mao ||  ||  || August 16, 2002 || Nanchuan || Q.-z. Ye || CRO || align=right | 6.4 km || 
|-id=826 bgcolor=#d6d6d6
| 132826 ||  || — || August 27, 2002 || Palomar || NEAT || KOR || align=right | 2.0 km || 
|-id=827 bgcolor=#E9E9E9
| 132827 ||  || — || September 1, 2002 || Haleakala || NEAT || RAF || align=right | 1.8 km || 
|-id=828 bgcolor=#d6d6d6
| 132828 ||  || — || September 4, 2002 || Anderson Mesa || LONEOS || — || align=right | 6.8 km || 
|-id=829 bgcolor=#d6d6d6
| 132829 ||  || — || September 3, 2002 || Palomar || NEAT || — || align=right | 7.4 km || 
|-id=830 bgcolor=#d6d6d6
| 132830 ||  || — || September 3, 2002 || Haleakala || NEAT || KOR || align=right | 2.9 km || 
|-id=831 bgcolor=#E9E9E9
| 132831 ||  || — || September 4, 2002 || Palomar || NEAT || DOR || align=right | 3.9 km || 
|-id=832 bgcolor=#d6d6d6
| 132832 ||  || — || September 4, 2002 || Anderson Mesa || LONEOS || HYG || align=right | 6.8 km || 
|-id=833 bgcolor=#E9E9E9
| 132833 ||  || — || September 4, 2002 || Anderson Mesa || LONEOS || — || align=right | 4.0 km || 
|-id=834 bgcolor=#d6d6d6
| 132834 ||  || — || September 4, 2002 || Anderson Mesa || LONEOS || EOS || align=right | 4.1 km || 
|-id=835 bgcolor=#E9E9E9
| 132835 ||  || — || September 4, 2002 || Anderson Mesa || LONEOS || — || align=right | 4.3 km || 
|-id=836 bgcolor=#d6d6d6
| 132836 ||  || — || September 4, 2002 || Anderson Mesa || LONEOS || THM || align=right | 5.9 km || 
|-id=837 bgcolor=#E9E9E9
| 132837 ||  || — || September 4, 2002 || Anderson Mesa || LONEOS || — || align=right | 2.9 km || 
|-id=838 bgcolor=#d6d6d6
| 132838 ||  || — || September 3, 2002 || Needville || Needville Obs. || EOS || align=right | 2.6 km || 
|-id=839 bgcolor=#d6d6d6
| 132839 ||  || — || September 4, 2002 || Anderson Mesa || LONEOS || — || align=right | 5.3 km || 
|-id=840 bgcolor=#d6d6d6
| 132840 ||  || — || September 4, 2002 || Anderson Mesa || LONEOS || TRE || align=right | 3.5 km || 
|-id=841 bgcolor=#d6d6d6
| 132841 ||  || — || September 4, 2002 || Anderson Mesa || LONEOS || — || align=right | 5.7 km || 
|-id=842 bgcolor=#d6d6d6
| 132842 ||  || — || September 4, 2002 || Anderson Mesa || LONEOS || — || align=right | 4.2 km || 
|-id=843 bgcolor=#d6d6d6
| 132843 ||  || — || September 5, 2002 || Socorro || LINEAR || URS || align=right | 5.9 km || 
|-id=844 bgcolor=#d6d6d6
| 132844 ||  || — || September 5, 2002 || Socorro || LINEAR || — || align=right | 3.7 km || 
|-id=845 bgcolor=#d6d6d6
| 132845 ||  || — || September 5, 2002 || Socorro || LINEAR || THM || align=right | 4.0 km || 
|-id=846 bgcolor=#d6d6d6
| 132846 ||  || — || September 5, 2002 || Socorro || LINEAR || — || align=right | 4.8 km || 
|-id=847 bgcolor=#d6d6d6
| 132847 ||  || — || September 5, 2002 || Socorro || LINEAR || — || align=right | 5.0 km || 
|-id=848 bgcolor=#d6d6d6
| 132848 ||  || — || September 5, 2002 || Socorro || LINEAR || — || align=right | 5.1 km || 
|-id=849 bgcolor=#d6d6d6
| 132849 ||  || — || September 5, 2002 || Socorro || LINEAR || VER || align=right | 5.9 km || 
|-id=850 bgcolor=#d6d6d6
| 132850 ||  || — || September 5, 2002 || Socorro || LINEAR || — || align=right | 4.7 km || 
|-id=851 bgcolor=#d6d6d6
| 132851 ||  || — || September 5, 2002 || Socorro || LINEAR || — || align=right | 6.0 km || 
|-id=852 bgcolor=#d6d6d6
| 132852 ||  || — || September 5, 2002 || Socorro || LINEAR || KOR || align=right | 2.5 km || 
|-id=853 bgcolor=#d6d6d6
| 132853 ||  || — || September 5, 2002 || Anderson Mesa || LONEOS || — || align=right | 5.6 km || 
|-id=854 bgcolor=#E9E9E9
| 132854 ||  || — || September 5, 2002 || Anderson Mesa || LONEOS || — || align=right | 3.5 km || 
|-id=855 bgcolor=#E9E9E9
| 132855 ||  || — || September 5, 2002 || Anderson Mesa || LONEOS || — || align=right | 2.8 km || 
|-id=856 bgcolor=#E9E9E9
| 132856 ||  || — || September 5, 2002 || Socorro || LINEAR || — || align=right | 5.0 km || 
|-id=857 bgcolor=#d6d6d6
| 132857 ||  || — || September 3, 2002 || Palomar || NEAT || EOS || align=right | 3.5 km || 
|-id=858 bgcolor=#d6d6d6
| 132858 ||  || — || September 4, 2002 || Anderson Mesa || LONEOS || HYG || align=right | 5.0 km || 
|-id=859 bgcolor=#d6d6d6
| 132859 ||  || — || September 4, 2002 || Palomar || NEAT || TEL || align=right | 3.2 km || 
|-id=860 bgcolor=#d6d6d6
| 132860 ||  || — || September 4, 2002 || Palomar || NEAT || — || align=right | 6.8 km || 
|-id=861 bgcolor=#d6d6d6
| 132861 ||  || — || September 5, 2002 || Socorro || LINEAR || VER || align=right | 6.2 km || 
|-id=862 bgcolor=#d6d6d6
| 132862 ||  || — || September 5, 2002 || Socorro || LINEAR || THM || align=right | 3.9 km || 
|-id=863 bgcolor=#d6d6d6
| 132863 ||  || — || September 5, 2002 || Socorro || LINEAR || — || align=right | 4.6 km || 
|-id=864 bgcolor=#d6d6d6
| 132864 ||  || — || September 5, 2002 || Socorro || LINEAR || — || align=right | 4.7 km || 
|-id=865 bgcolor=#d6d6d6
| 132865 ||  || — || September 5, 2002 || Socorro || LINEAR || HYG || align=right | 6.7 km || 
|-id=866 bgcolor=#d6d6d6
| 132866 ||  || — || September 5, 2002 || Socorro || LINEAR || HYG || align=right | 5.9 km || 
|-id=867 bgcolor=#d6d6d6
| 132867 ||  || — || September 5, 2002 || Socorro || LINEAR || THM || align=right | 4.7 km || 
|-id=868 bgcolor=#d6d6d6
| 132868 ||  || — || September 5, 2002 || Socorro || LINEAR || SHU3:2 || align=right | 8.9 km || 
|-id=869 bgcolor=#d6d6d6
| 132869 ||  || — || September 5, 2002 || Socorro || LINEAR || THM || align=right | 5.6 km || 
|-id=870 bgcolor=#d6d6d6
| 132870 ||  || — || September 5, 2002 || Socorro || LINEAR || MEL || align=right | 8.1 km || 
|-id=871 bgcolor=#E9E9E9
| 132871 ||  || — || September 5, 2002 || Socorro || LINEAR || DOR || align=right | 5.3 km || 
|-id=872 bgcolor=#d6d6d6
| 132872 ||  || — || September 6, 2002 || Socorro || LINEAR || — || align=right | 4.9 km || 
|-id=873 bgcolor=#d6d6d6
| 132873 ||  || — || September 5, 2002 || Anderson Mesa || LONEOS || — || align=right | 8.2 km || 
|-id=874 bgcolor=#FA8072
| 132874 Latinovits ||  ||  || September 9, 2002 || Piszkéstető || K. Sárneczky || H || align=right data-sort-value="0.71" | 710 m || 
|-id=875 bgcolor=#d6d6d6
| 132875 ||  || — || September 7, 2002 || Socorro || LINEAR || — || align=right | 7.7 km || 
|-id=876 bgcolor=#d6d6d6
| 132876 ||  || — || September 7, 2002 || Socorro || LINEAR || — || align=right | 6.7 km || 
|-id=877 bgcolor=#d6d6d6
| 132877 ||  || — || September 9, 2002 || Palomar || NEAT || EOS || align=right | 4.2 km || 
|-id=878 bgcolor=#d6d6d6
| 132878 ||  || — || September 7, 2002 || Socorro || LINEAR || — || align=right | 6.0 km || 
|-id=879 bgcolor=#E9E9E9
| 132879 ||  || — || September 10, 2002 || Palomar || NEAT || MAR || align=right | 2.5 km || 
|-id=880 bgcolor=#d6d6d6
| 132880 ||  || — || September 9, 2002 || Haleakala || NEAT || HYG || align=right | 5.0 km || 
|-id=881 bgcolor=#d6d6d6
| 132881 ||  || — || September 10, 2002 || Palomar || NEAT || EOS || align=right | 3.9 km || 
|-id=882 bgcolor=#d6d6d6
| 132882 ||  || — || September 10, 2002 || Haleakala || NEAT || — || align=right | 4.8 km || 
|-id=883 bgcolor=#d6d6d6
| 132883 ||  || — || September 10, 2002 || Palomar || NEAT || — || align=right | 5.1 km || 
|-id=884 bgcolor=#d6d6d6
| 132884 ||  || — || September 11, 2002 || Palomar || NEAT || EOS || align=right | 3.3 km || 
|-id=885 bgcolor=#d6d6d6
| 132885 ||  || — || September 11, 2002 || Haleakala || NEAT || EOS || align=right | 4.4 km || 
|-id=886 bgcolor=#d6d6d6
| 132886 ||  || — || September 11, 2002 || Haleakala || NEAT || — || align=right | 5.6 km || 
|-id=887 bgcolor=#d6d6d6
| 132887 ||  || — || September 11, 2002 || Palomar || NEAT || — || align=right | 5.7 km || 
|-id=888 bgcolor=#d6d6d6
| 132888 ||  || — || September 11, 2002 || Palomar || NEAT || URS || align=right | 5.3 km || 
|-id=889 bgcolor=#d6d6d6
| 132889 ||  || — || September 12, 2002 || Palomar || NEAT || HYG || align=right | 4.6 km || 
|-id=890 bgcolor=#d6d6d6
| 132890 ||  || — || September 13, 2002 || Palomar || NEAT || EOS || align=right | 2.8 km || 
|-id=891 bgcolor=#E9E9E9
| 132891 ||  || — || September 13, 2002 || Palomar || NEAT || PAD || align=right | 3.6 km || 
|-id=892 bgcolor=#d6d6d6
| 132892 ||  || — || September 13, 2002 || Palomar || NEAT || — || align=right | 5.2 km || 
|-id=893 bgcolor=#d6d6d6
| 132893 ||  || — || September 12, 2002 || Palomar || NEAT || EOS || align=right | 4.8 km || 
|-id=894 bgcolor=#d6d6d6
| 132894 ||  || — || September 12, 2002 || Palomar || NEAT || — || align=right | 6.3 km || 
|-id=895 bgcolor=#d6d6d6
| 132895 ||  || — || September 13, 2002 || Palomar || NEAT || — || align=right | 4.0 km || 
|-id=896 bgcolor=#d6d6d6
| 132896 ||  || — || September 13, 2002 || Palomar || NEAT || — || align=right | 3.8 km || 
|-id=897 bgcolor=#d6d6d6
| 132897 ||  || — || September 13, 2002 || Palomar || NEAT || — || align=right | 3.9 km || 
|-id=898 bgcolor=#d6d6d6
| 132898 ||  || — || September 14, 2002 || Palomar || NEAT || — || align=right | 4.4 km || 
|-id=899 bgcolor=#d6d6d6
| 132899 ||  || — || September 15, 2002 || Haleakala || NEAT || — || align=right | 6.5 km || 
|-id=900 bgcolor=#d6d6d6
| 132900 ||  || — || September 13, 2002 || Socorro || LINEAR || — || align=right | 6.4 km || 
|}

132901–133000 

|-bgcolor=#d6d6d6
| 132901 ||  || — || September 15, 2002 || Palomar || NEAT || — || align=right | 5.3 km || 
|-id=902 bgcolor=#d6d6d6
| 132902 ||  || — || September 8, 2002 || Haleakala || R. Matson || — || align=right | 5.9 km || 
|-id=903 bgcolor=#d6d6d6
| 132903 Edgibson ||  ||  || September 14, 2002 || Palomar || R. Matson || THM || align=right | 3.7 km || 
|-id=904 bgcolor=#d6d6d6
| 132904 Notkin ||  ||  || September 12, 2002 || Palomar || R. Matson || 3:2 || align=right | 7.2 km || 
|-id=905 bgcolor=#d6d6d6
| 132905 ||  || — || September 15, 2002 || Palomar || R. Matson || EOS || align=right | 3.3 km || 
|-id=906 bgcolor=#d6d6d6
| 132906 ||  || — || September 9, 2002 || Palomar || NEAT || — || align=right | 4.3 km || 
|-id=907 bgcolor=#d6d6d6
| 132907 ||  || — || September 15, 2002 || Palomar || NEAT || — || align=right | 5.3 km || 
|-id=908 bgcolor=#E9E9E9
| 132908 ||  || — || September 27, 2002 || Palomar || NEAT || — || align=right | 2.9 km || 
|-id=909 bgcolor=#E9E9E9
| 132909 ||  || — || September 27, 2002 || Palomar || NEAT || — || align=right | 3.4 km || 
|-id=910 bgcolor=#E9E9E9
| 132910 ||  || — || September 27, 2002 || Palomar || NEAT || — || align=right | 2.9 km || 
|-id=911 bgcolor=#d6d6d6
| 132911 ||  || — || September 27, 2002 || Anderson Mesa || LONEOS || 628 || align=right | 3.2 km || 
|-id=912 bgcolor=#d6d6d6
| 132912 ||  || — || September 26, 2002 || Palomar || NEAT || — || align=right | 5.4 km || 
|-id=913 bgcolor=#E9E9E9
| 132913 ||  || — || September 27, 2002 || Socorro || LINEAR || — || align=right | 3.7 km || 
|-id=914 bgcolor=#d6d6d6
| 132914 ||  || — || September 28, 2002 || Haleakala || NEAT || — || align=right | 6.5 km || 
|-id=915 bgcolor=#d6d6d6
| 132915 ||  || — || September 26, 2002 || Palomar || NEAT || — || align=right | 4.0 km || 
|-id=916 bgcolor=#E9E9E9
| 132916 ||  || — || September 29, 2002 || Ondřejov || P. Pravec || — || align=right | 3.7 km || 
|-id=917 bgcolor=#E9E9E9
| 132917 ||  || — || September 28, 2002 || Haleakala || NEAT || — || align=right | 4.0 km || 
|-id=918 bgcolor=#d6d6d6
| 132918 ||  || — || September 28, 2002 || Haleakala || NEAT || — || align=right | 6.3 km || 
|-id=919 bgcolor=#d6d6d6
| 132919 ||  || — || September 29, 2002 || Haleakala || NEAT || — || align=right | 4.9 km || 
|-id=920 bgcolor=#d6d6d6
| 132920 ||  || — || September 29, 2002 || Haleakala || NEAT || — || align=right | 6.5 km || 
|-id=921 bgcolor=#d6d6d6
| 132921 ||  || — || September 28, 2002 || Palomar || NEAT || — || align=right | 8.4 km || 
|-id=922 bgcolor=#E9E9E9
| 132922 ||  || — || September 28, 2002 || Haleakala || NEAT || — || align=right | 2.9 km || 
|-id=923 bgcolor=#d6d6d6
| 132923 ||  || — || September 30, 2002 || Socorro || LINEAR || EOS || align=right | 7.3 km || 
|-id=924 bgcolor=#d6d6d6
| 132924 ||  || — || September 30, 2002 || Socorro || LINEAR || — || align=right | 5.3 km || 
|-id=925 bgcolor=#d6d6d6
| 132925 ||  || — || September 30, 2002 || Socorro || LINEAR || THM || align=right | 4.0 km || 
|-id=926 bgcolor=#d6d6d6
| 132926 ||  || — || September 30, 2002 || Haleakala || NEAT || EOS || align=right | 3.7 km || 
|-id=927 bgcolor=#d6d6d6
| 132927 ||  || — || September 18, 2002 || Palomar || NEAT || — || align=right | 5.9 km || 
|-id=928 bgcolor=#d6d6d6
| 132928 ||  || — || September 18, 2002 || Palomar || NEAT || — || align=right | 6.2 km || 
|-id=929 bgcolor=#d6d6d6
| 132929 ||  || — || September 30, 2002 || Socorro || LINEAR || — || align=right | 5.0 km || 
|-id=930 bgcolor=#d6d6d6
| 132930 ||  || — || September 30, 2002 || Socorro || LINEAR || — || align=right | 4.5 km || 
|-id=931 bgcolor=#E9E9E9
| 132931 ||  || — || September 16, 2002 || Palomar || NEAT || — || align=right | 3.3 km || 
|-id=932 bgcolor=#d6d6d6
| 132932 ||  || — || September 27, 2002 || Palomar || NEAT || EUP || align=right | 11 km || 
|-id=933 bgcolor=#E9E9E9
| 132933 || 2002 TC || — || October 1, 2002 || Anderson Mesa || LONEOS || — || align=right | 4.5 km || 
|-id=934 bgcolor=#d6d6d6
| 132934 ||  || — || October 1, 2002 || Anderson Mesa || LONEOS || — || align=right | 4.8 km || 
|-id=935 bgcolor=#d6d6d6
| 132935 ||  || — || October 1, 2002 || Anderson Mesa || LONEOS || HYG || align=right | 5.7 km || 
|-id=936 bgcolor=#E9E9E9
| 132936 ||  || — || October 2, 2002 || Socorro || LINEAR || — || align=right | 3.1 km || 
|-id=937 bgcolor=#d6d6d6
| 132937 ||  || — || October 2, 2002 || Socorro || LINEAR || THM || align=right | 6.4 km || 
|-id=938 bgcolor=#d6d6d6
| 132938 ||  || — || October 2, 2002 || Socorro || LINEAR || THM || align=right | 3.8 km || 
|-id=939 bgcolor=#E9E9E9
| 132939 ||  || — || October 2, 2002 || Socorro || LINEAR || — || align=right | 2.9 km || 
|-id=940 bgcolor=#E9E9E9
| 132940 ||  || — || October 2, 2002 || Socorro || LINEAR || — || align=right | 2.3 km || 
|-id=941 bgcolor=#d6d6d6
| 132941 ||  || — || October 2, 2002 || Socorro || LINEAR || — || align=right | 8.7 km || 
|-id=942 bgcolor=#d6d6d6
| 132942 ||  || — || October 2, 2002 || Socorro || LINEAR || — || align=right | 6.9 km || 
|-id=943 bgcolor=#d6d6d6
| 132943 ||  || — || October 2, 2002 || Socorro || LINEAR || THM || align=right | 5.8 km || 
|-id=944 bgcolor=#d6d6d6
| 132944 ||  || — || October 2, 2002 || Socorro || LINEAR || — || align=right | 6.9 km || 
|-id=945 bgcolor=#d6d6d6
| 132945 ||  || — || October 2, 2002 || Socorro || LINEAR || THM || align=right | 4.6 km || 
|-id=946 bgcolor=#E9E9E9
| 132946 ||  || — || October 4, 2002 || Pla D'Arguines || R. Ferrando || EUN || align=right | 2.1 km || 
|-id=947 bgcolor=#d6d6d6
| 132947 ||  || — || October 3, 2002 || Palomar || NEAT || URS || align=right | 7.8 km || 
|-id=948 bgcolor=#d6d6d6
| 132948 ||  || — || October 4, 2002 || Palomar || NEAT || 7:4 || align=right | 6.9 km || 
|-id=949 bgcolor=#d6d6d6
| 132949 ||  || — || October 3, 2002 || Palomar || NEAT || — || align=right | 8.3 km || 
|-id=950 bgcolor=#E9E9E9
| 132950 ||  || — || October 3, 2002 || Palomar || NEAT || — || align=right | 5.0 km || 
|-id=951 bgcolor=#E9E9E9
| 132951 ||  || — || October 3, 2002 || Palomar || NEAT || — || align=right | 6.0 km || 
|-id=952 bgcolor=#d6d6d6
| 132952 ||  || — || October 3, 2002 || Palomar || NEAT || — || align=right | 7.9 km || 
|-id=953 bgcolor=#d6d6d6
| 132953 ||  || — || October 2, 2002 || Socorro || LINEAR || URS || align=right | 7.6 km || 
|-id=954 bgcolor=#E9E9E9
| 132954 ||  || — || October 2, 2002 || Haleakala || NEAT || — || align=right | 3.0 km || 
|-id=955 bgcolor=#E9E9E9
| 132955 ||  || — || October 2, 2002 || Haleakala || NEAT || ADE || align=right | 4.8 km || 
|-id=956 bgcolor=#d6d6d6
| 132956 ||  || — || October 3, 2002 || Socorro || LINEAR || — || align=right | 5.4 km || 
|-id=957 bgcolor=#d6d6d6
| 132957 ||  || — || October 3, 2002 || Palomar || NEAT || — || align=right | 7.2 km || 
|-id=958 bgcolor=#d6d6d6
| 132958 ||  || — || October 1, 2002 || Haleakala || NEAT || — || align=right | 6.6 km || 
|-id=959 bgcolor=#d6d6d6
| 132959 ||  || — || October 1, 2002 || Haleakala || NEAT || — || align=right | 5.7 km || 
|-id=960 bgcolor=#d6d6d6
| 132960 ||  || — || October 3, 2002 || Palomar || NEAT || EOS || align=right | 4.7 km || 
|-id=961 bgcolor=#d6d6d6
| 132961 ||  || — || October 3, 2002 || Palomar || NEAT || ALA || align=right | 9.8 km || 
|-id=962 bgcolor=#d6d6d6
| 132962 ||  || — || October 3, 2002 || Palomar || NEAT || TIR || align=right | 7.7 km || 
|-id=963 bgcolor=#d6d6d6
| 132963 ||  || — || October 4, 2002 || Palomar || NEAT || — || align=right | 6.9 km || 
|-id=964 bgcolor=#E9E9E9
| 132964 ||  || — || October 4, 2002 || Socorro || LINEAR || — || align=right | 1.7 km || 
|-id=965 bgcolor=#d6d6d6
| 132965 ||  || — || October 4, 2002 || Socorro || LINEAR || — || align=right | 5.3 km || 
|-id=966 bgcolor=#E9E9E9
| 132966 ||  || — || October 4, 2002 || Socorro || LINEAR || — || align=right | 5.3 km || 
|-id=967 bgcolor=#E9E9E9
| 132967 ||  || — || October 4, 2002 || Socorro || LINEAR || — || align=right | 3.6 km || 
|-id=968 bgcolor=#d6d6d6
| 132968 ||  || — || October 4, 2002 || Anderson Mesa || LONEOS || LIX || align=right | 9.6 km || 
|-id=969 bgcolor=#E9E9E9
| 132969 ||  || — || October 4, 2002 || Anderson Mesa || LONEOS || GEF || align=right | 3.2 km || 
|-id=970 bgcolor=#d6d6d6
| 132970 ||  || — || October 4, 2002 || Socorro || LINEAR || — || align=right | 7.0 km || 
|-id=971 bgcolor=#d6d6d6
| 132971 ||  || — || October 4, 2002 || Socorro || LINEAR || — || align=right | 6.7 km || 
|-id=972 bgcolor=#fefefe
| 132972 ||  || — || October 5, 2002 || Palomar || NEAT || H || align=right data-sort-value="0.97" | 970 m || 
|-id=973 bgcolor=#d6d6d6
| 132973 ||  || — || October 2, 2002 || Haleakala || NEAT || EOS || align=right | 4.6 km || 
|-id=974 bgcolor=#d6d6d6
| 132974 ||  || — || October 3, 2002 || Palomar || NEAT || — || align=right | 7.5 km || 
|-id=975 bgcolor=#d6d6d6
| 132975 ||  || — || October 4, 2002 || Anderson Mesa || LONEOS || — || align=right | 10 km || 
|-id=976 bgcolor=#d6d6d6
| 132976 ||  || — || October 4, 2002 || Socorro || LINEAR || HYG || align=right | 7.4 km || 
|-id=977 bgcolor=#fefefe
| 132977 ||  || — || October 11, 2002 || Palomar || NEAT || H || align=right | 1.1 km || 
|-id=978 bgcolor=#E9E9E9
| 132978 ||  || — || October 4, 2002 || Socorro || LINEAR || — || align=right | 4.8 km || 
|-id=979 bgcolor=#E9E9E9
| 132979 ||  || — || October 4, 2002 || Socorro || LINEAR || — || align=right | 5.0 km || 
|-id=980 bgcolor=#E9E9E9
| 132980 ||  || — || October 4, 2002 || Socorro || LINEAR || GEF || align=right | 3.6 km || 
|-id=981 bgcolor=#d6d6d6
| 132981 ||  || — || October 6, 2002 || Socorro || LINEAR || — || align=right | 5.8 km || 
|-id=982 bgcolor=#d6d6d6
| 132982 ||  || — || October 3, 2002 || Socorro || LINEAR || EOS || align=right | 4.4 km || 
|-id=983 bgcolor=#d6d6d6
| 132983 ||  || — || October 4, 2002 || Palomar || NEAT || HYG || align=right | 5.6 km || 
|-id=984 bgcolor=#d6d6d6
| 132984 ||  || — || October 4, 2002 || Socorro || LINEAR || — || align=right | 8.4 km || 
|-id=985 bgcolor=#E9E9E9
| 132985 ||  || — || October 5, 2002 || Anderson Mesa || LONEOS || — || align=right | 2.9 km || 
|-id=986 bgcolor=#d6d6d6
| 132986 ||  || — || October 4, 2002 || Socorro || LINEAR || — || align=right | 4.5 km || 
|-id=987 bgcolor=#d6d6d6
| 132987 ||  || — || October 4, 2002 || Socorro || LINEAR || — || align=right | 8.5 km || 
|-id=988 bgcolor=#E9E9E9
| 132988 ||  || — || October 5, 2002 || Socorro || LINEAR || — || align=right | 4.6 km || 
|-id=989 bgcolor=#d6d6d6
| 132989 ||  || — || October 5, 2002 || Socorro || LINEAR || EOS || align=right | 5.1 km || 
|-id=990 bgcolor=#d6d6d6
| 132990 ||  || — || October 8, 2002 || Anderson Mesa || LONEOS || HYG || align=right | 5.5 km || 
|-id=991 bgcolor=#d6d6d6
| 132991 ||  || — || October 8, 2002 || Anderson Mesa || LONEOS || 637 || align=right | 6.4 km || 
|-id=992 bgcolor=#E9E9E9
| 132992 ||  || — || October 7, 2002 || Palomar || NEAT || — || align=right | 3.5 km || 
|-id=993 bgcolor=#E9E9E9
| 132993 ||  || — || October 6, 2002 || Socorro || LINEAR || — || align=right | 5.3 km || 
|-id=994 bgcolor=#d6d6d6
| 132994 ||  || — || October 6, 2002 || Palomar || NEAT || — || align=right | 7.3 km || 
|-id=995 bgcolor=#E9E9E9
| 132995 ||  || — || October 7, 2002 || Haleakala || NEAT || — || align=right | 4.9 km || 
|-id=996 bgcolor=#d6d6d6
| 132996 ||  || — || October 9, 2002 || Anderson Mesa || LONEOS || — || align=right | 3.9 km || 
|-id=997 bgcolor=#E9E9E9
| 132997 ||  || — || October 9, 2002 || Socorro || LINEAR || — || align=right | 5.1 km || 
|-id=998 bgcolor=#E9E9E9
| 132998 ||  || — || October 9, 2002 || Socorro || LINEAR || — || align=right | 4.1 km || 
|-id=999 bgcolor=#E9E9E9
| 132999 ||  || — || October 9, 2002 || Socorro || LINEAR || — || align=right | 5.9 km || 
|-id=000 bgcolor=#d6d6d6
| 133000 ||  || — || October 10, 2002 || Socorro || LINEAR || — || align=right | 7.3 km || 
|}

References

External links 
 Discovery Circumstances: Numbered Minor Planets (130001)–(135000) (IAU Minor Planet Center)

0132